= List of beetles of Nepal (Cerambycidae) =

The following is a list of Cerambycidae of Nepal. Four-hundred and sixty eight species are listed.

This list is primarily based on Andreas Weigel's 2006 list and Maxim Lazarev's 2019 list with some recent additions and a modernized classification.

== Subfamily Disteniinae ==
- Dynamostes audax
- Cyrtonops punctipennis
- Aegosoma ornaticolle

== Subfamily Prioninae ==
- Bandar pascoei
- Anomophysis
  - Anomophysis elliotti
  - Anomophysis inscripta
  - Anomophysis plagiata
  - Anomophysis spinosa
- Cantharocnemis downesii
- Rhaphipodus gahani
- Megopis
  - Megopis bowringi
  - Megopis buckleyi
  - Megopis (Spinimegopis) nepalensis
  - Megopis sulcipennis
  - Megopis (Spinimegopis) tibialis
- Casiphia himalayaensis
- Dorysthenes
  - Dorysthenes buquetii
  - Dorysthenes huegelii
  - Dorysthenes indicus
  - Dorysthenes sternalis
  - Dorysthenes zivetta
- Prionus corpulentus
- Sarmydus
  - Sarmydus antennatus
  - Sarmydus subcoriaceus
- Necydalis nepalensis
- Arhopalus tibetanus
- Tetropium oreinum
- Atimia juniperi
- Caraphia granulifera
- Formosotoxotus nobuoi
- Pachyta perlata
- Anastrangalia
  - Anastrangalia lavinia
  - Anastrangalia rubriola
- Gahanaspia miniacea
- Idiostrangalia quadrisignata
- Leptura lavinia
- Nanostrangalia torui
- Paranaspia frainii
- Parastrangalis emotoi
- Strangalia bilineaticollis
- Palaeoxylosteus kucerai

== Subfamily Cerambycinae ==
- Comusia thailandica
- Neomarius thomasi
- Noserius indicus
- Oemospila maculipennis
- Oplatocera oberthuri
- Plocaederus ruficornis
- Tetraommatus fragilis
- Xystrocera globosa
- Aeolesthes indicola
- Derolus volvulus
- Dialeges pauper
- Diorthus pellitulus
- Dymasius subvestitus
- Hoplocerambyx spinicornis
- Margites modicus
- Massicus dierli
- Neocerambyx paris
- Pachydissus parvicollis
- Rhytidodera
  - Rhytidodera bowringi
  - Rhytidodera consona
  - Rhytidodera simluans
- Xoanodera regularis
- Nortia fuscata
- Stromatium barbatum

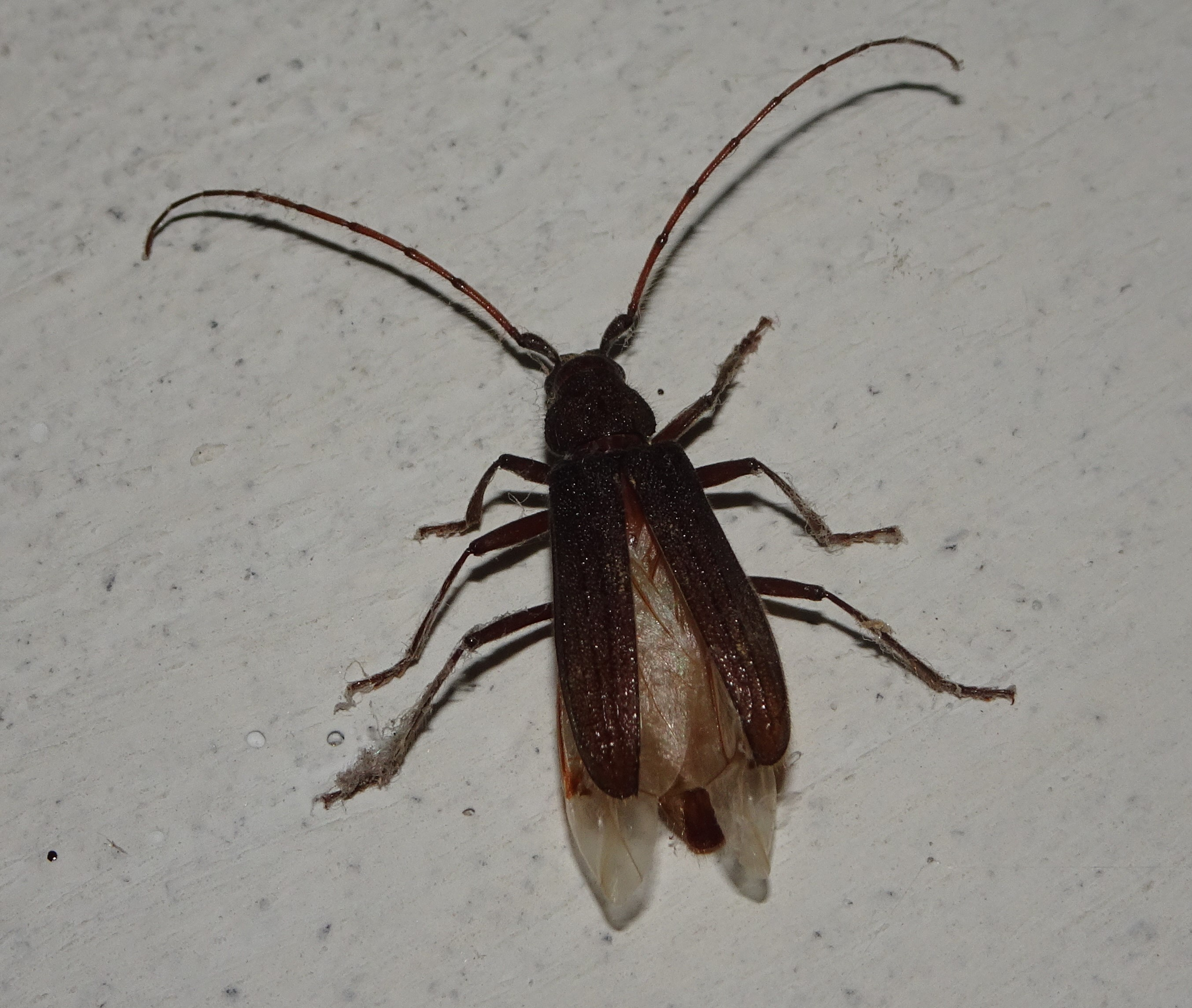
Stromatium barbatum in Pokhara, Sarangkot

- Zoodes basalis
- Nyphasia
  - Nyphasia apicalis
  - Nyphasia fuscipennis
  - Nyphasia pascoei
- Ceresium
  - Ceresium leucosticticum
  - Ceresium lucifugum
  - Ceresium propinquum

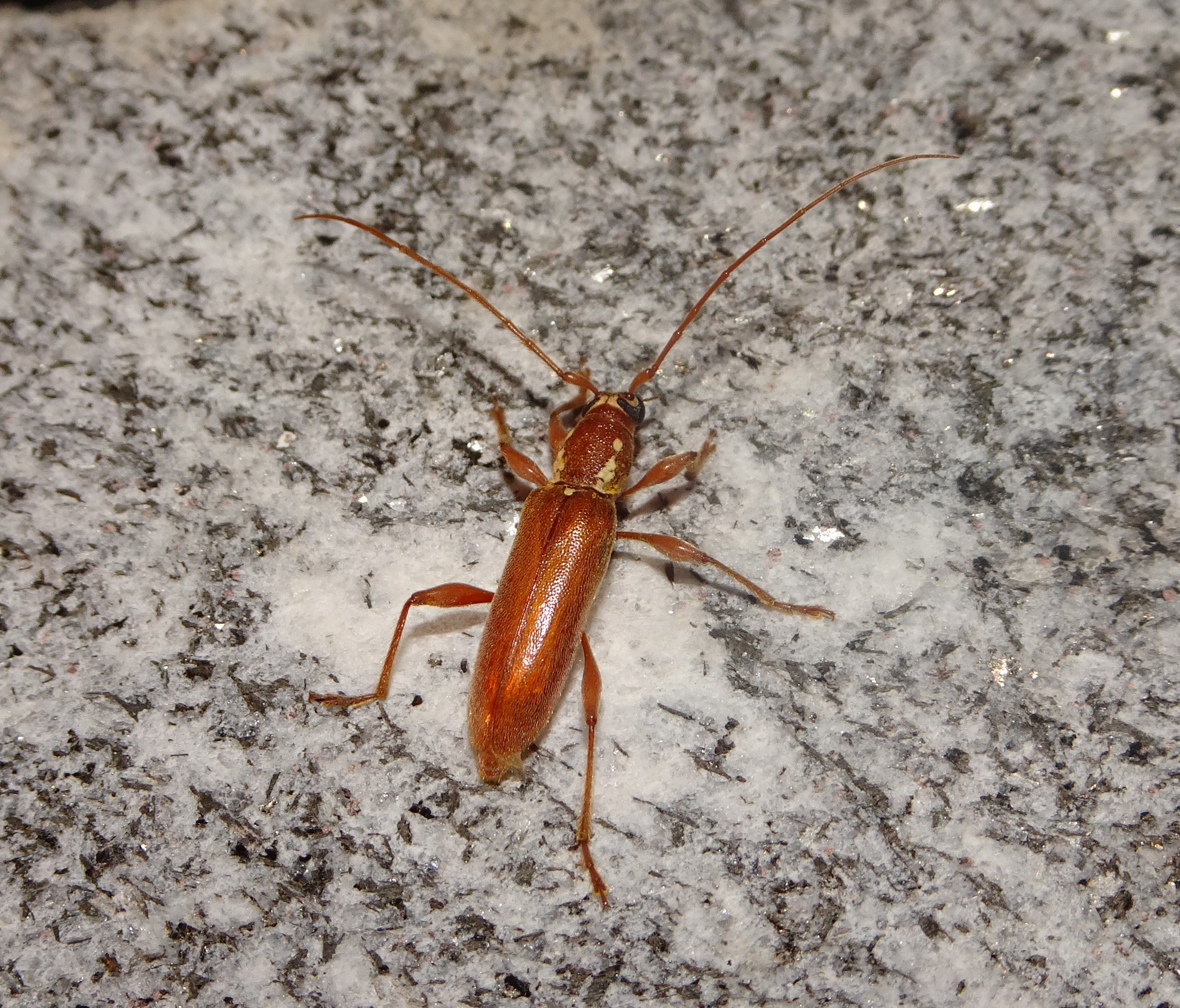
Ceresium propinquum in Pokhara, Lakeside

- Stenodryas
  - Stenodryas apicalis
  - Stenodryas nigromaculatus
- Obrium
  - Obrium aegrotum
  - Obrium posticum
- Stenhomalus
  - Stenhomalus fenestratus
  - Stenhomalus versicolor
- Prothema aurata
- Epania
  - Epania abdominalis
  - Epania mundali
  - Epania picipes
- Molorchus
  - Molorchus darjeelingensis
  - Molorchus molorchoides
  - Molorchus shimai
- Berndgerdia balteata
- Euchlanis
  - Euchlanis argentifer
  - Euchlanis robustulus
  - Euchlanis testacea
- Merionoeda
  - Merionoeda indica
  - Merionoeda nigriceps
  - Merionoeda phoebe
- Anubis inermis
- Aphrodisium
  - Aphrodisium cantori
  - Aphrodisium cribricolle
  - Aphrodisium hardwickianum
- Pachyteria fasciata
- Thranius simplex
- Acrocyrtidus auricomus
- Rosalia
  - Rosalia formosa
  - Rosalia hariola
  - Rosalia lateritia
- Gerdberndia
  - Gerdberndia atricolor
  - Gerdberndia ferrocyaneus
  - Gerdberndia nubigena
- Semanotus nigroalbus
- Chlorophorus
  - Chlorophorus acrocarpi
  - Chlorophorus annularis

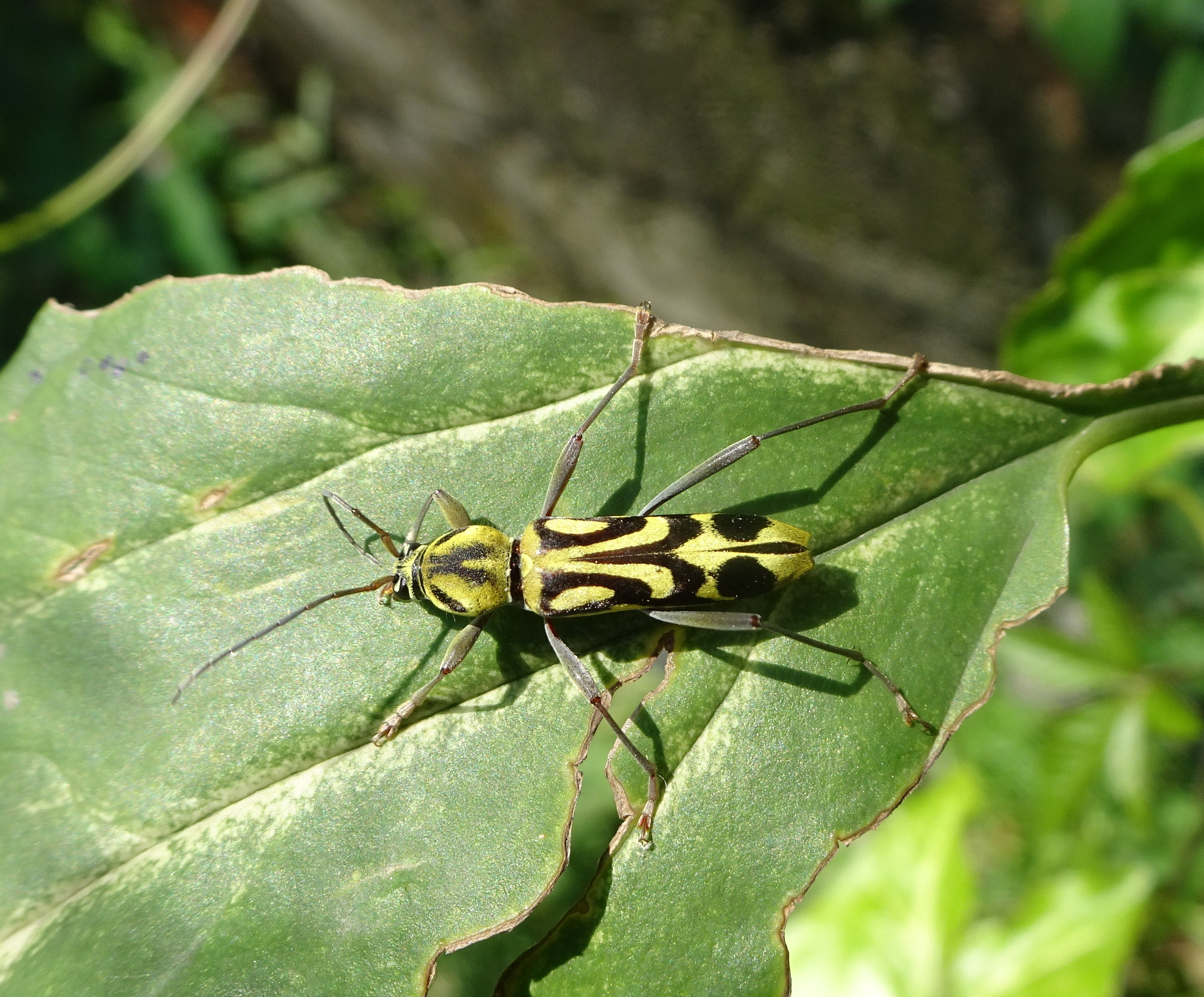
Chlorophorus annularis in Pokhara, Lakeside

  - Chlorophorus annularoides
  - Chlorophorus annulatus

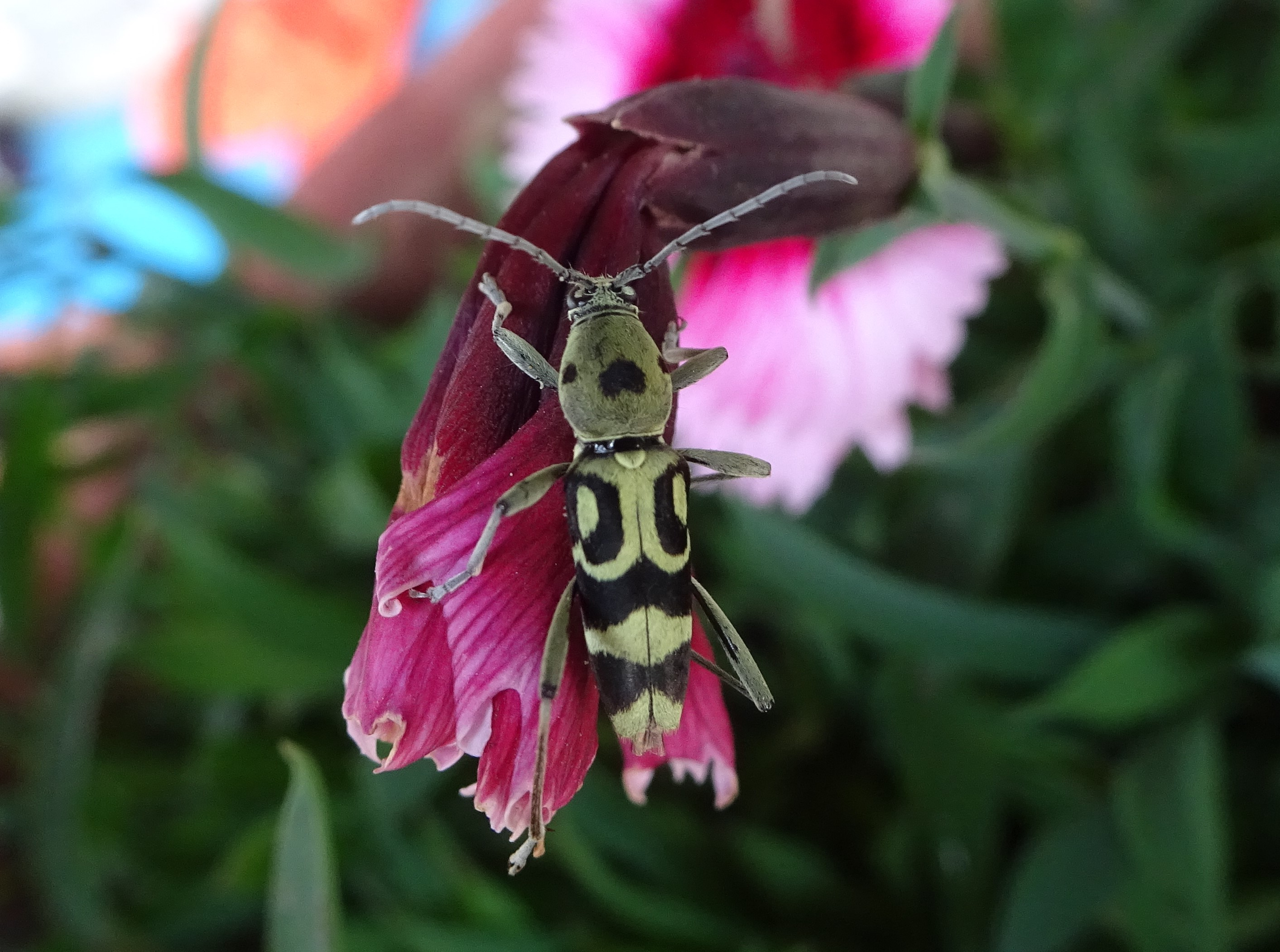
Chlorophorus annulatus in Pokhara, Lakeside

  - Chlorophorus anulifer
  - Chlorophorus arciferus
  - Chlorophorus assimilis
  - Chlorophorus dureli
  - Chlorophorus furcillatus
  - Chlorophorus henriettae
  - Chlorophorus insidiosus
  - Chlorophorus nepalensis
  - Chlorophorus quaduordecimmaculatus
  - Chlorophorus reductus
- Demonax
  - Demonax albicinctus
  - Demonax ascendens
  - Demonax balyi
  - Demonax bicinctus
  - Demonax buteae
  - Demonax cf. breveluteobasalis (possibly Demonax breveluteobasalis)
  - Demonax christinae
  - Demonax dorotheae
  - Demonax gertrudae
  - Demonax gunjii
  - Demonax himalayanus
  - Demonax ingridae
  - Demonax josefinae
  - Demonax katarinae
  - Demonax leucoscutellatus
  - Demonax mariae
  - Demonax narayani
  - Demonax nigromaculatus
  - Demonax rosae
  - Demonax sabinae
  - Demonax semiluctuosus
  - Demonax testaceus
  - Demonax trudae
- Hesperoclytus katarinae
- Ischnodora separanda
- Perissus
  - Perissus fuliginosus
  - Perissus magdalenae
  - Perissus mutabilis
  - Perissus quercus
- Rhaphuma
  - Rhaphuma afflata
  - Rhaphuma anopla
  - Rhaphuma aranea
  - Rhaphuma bhaktai
  - Rhaphuma brigittae
  - Rhaphuma chatterjeei
  - Rhaphuma fulgurata
  - Rhaphuma hermina
  - Rhaphuma horsfieldi
  - Rhaphuma ilsae
  - Rhaphuma joshi
  - Rhaphuma moerens
  - Rhaphuma nishidai
  - Rhaphuma praeusta
  - Rhaphuma quadrimaculata
  - Rhaphuma querciphaga
  - Rhaphuma sharmai
  - Rhaphuma weigeli
- Xylotrechus
  - Xylotrechus arunensis
  - Xylotrechus basifuliginosuss

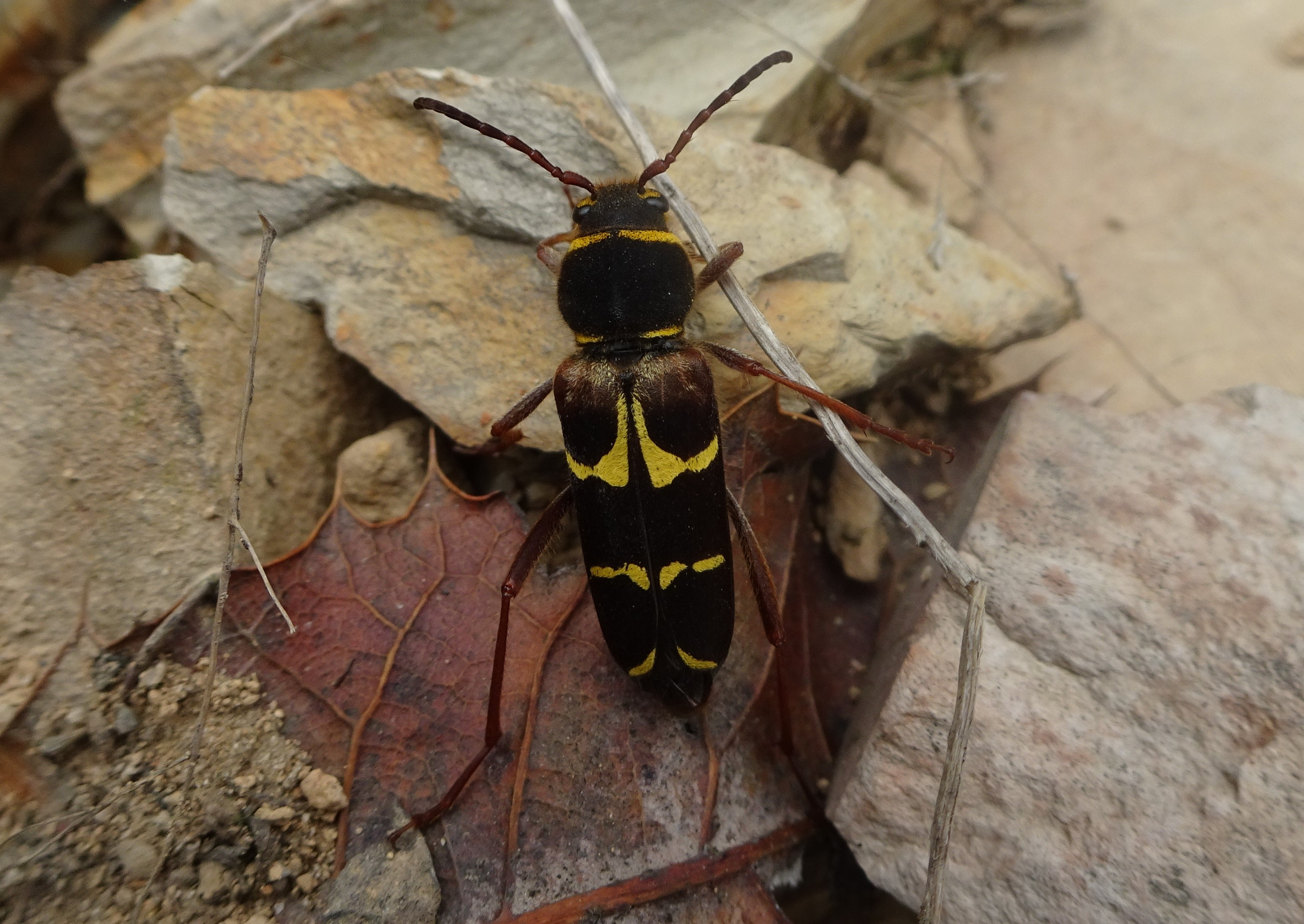
Xylotrechus basifuliginosuss in Kathmandu, Chandragiri

  - Xylotrechus buqueti
  - Xylotrechus contortus
  - Xylotrechus difformis
  - Xylotrechus gestroi
  - Xylotrechus incurvatus
  - Xylotrechus javanicus
  - Xylotrechus longithorax
  - Xylotrechus smei
  - Xylotrechus stebbingi
  - Xylotrechus subcarinatus
  - Xylotrechus subdepressus
- Anaglyptus
  - Anaglyptus abieticola
  - Anaglyptus fasciatus
  - Anaglyptus marmoratus
- Epipedocera
  - Epipedocera affinis
  - Epipedocera chakhata
  - Epipedocera undulata
  - Epipedocera zona
- Erythrus
  - Erythrus coccineus
  - Erythrus suturellus
  - Erythrus westwoodi
- Pyrestes
  - Pyrestes pyrrhus
  - Pyrestes rufipes nepalicus
- Pyrocalymma pyrochroides
- Artimpaza
  - Artimpaza dehra
  - Artimpaza obscura
  - Artimpaza punctigera
- Cleomenes
  - Cleomenes apicalis
  - Cleomenes ornatus
- Dere
  - Dere grahami
  - Dere khatrii
  - Dere opacula
- Diplothorax fasciatus
- Nida championi
- Paramimistena gracilicornis
- Euryphagus lundii
- Purpuricenus optabilis

== Subfamily Lamiinae ==
- Parathylactus dorsalis
- Thylactus sikkimensis
- Xylorhiza adusta
- Aconodes
  - Aconodes euphorbiae
  - Aconodes latefasciatus
  - Aconodes montanus
  - Aconodes nepalensis
- Dolophrades mustanganus
- Morimopsis dalihodi
- Trichodorcadion gardneri
- Acalolepta
  - Acalolepta aurata
  - Acalolepta battonii
  - Acalolepta breviscapa
  - Acalolepta cervina
  - Acalolepta elongata
  - Acalolepta freudei
  - Acalolepta haradai
  - Acalolepta griseipennis
  - Acalolepta longicollis
  - Acalolepta nepalensis
  - Acalolepta semidegenera
  - Acalolepta sericans
  - Acalolepta sikkimensis rufoantennata
  - Acalolepta affinis
- Annamanum sikkimense
- Aristobia
  - Aristobia horridula
  - Aristobia testudo
- Blepephaeus
  - Blepephaeus nepalensis
  - Blepephaeus ocellatus
  - Blepephaeus succinctor
- Celosterna scabrator
- Combe brianus
- Cremnosterna carissima
- Epepeotes uncinatus
- Macrochenus guerini
- Monochamus
  - Monochamus basifossulatus
  - Monochamus bimaculatus
  - Monochamus dubius
- Paraleprodera
  - Paraleprodera insidiosa
  - Paraleprodera stephanus
- Parepepeotes guttatus
- Pharsalia subgemmata

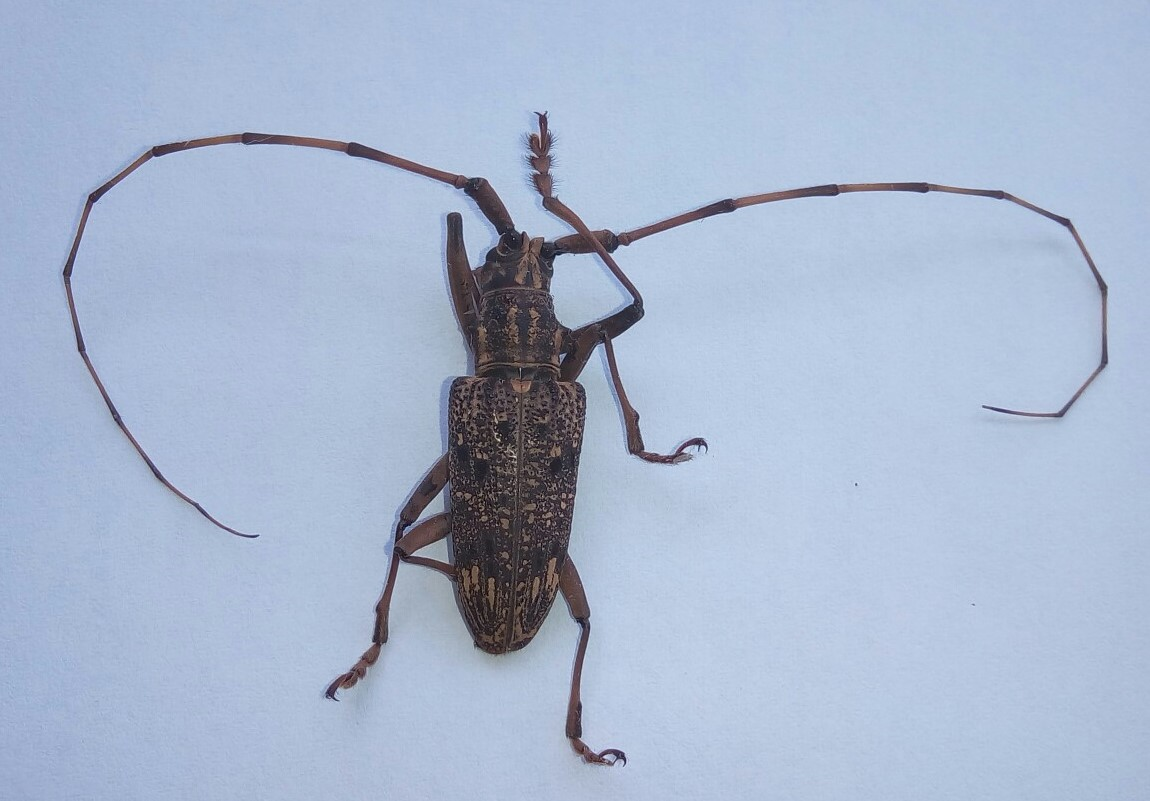
Pharsalia subgemmata in Lamjung, Sundarbazar

- Pseudonemophas versteegi
- Xenicotela distincta
- Apriona
  - Apriona germari

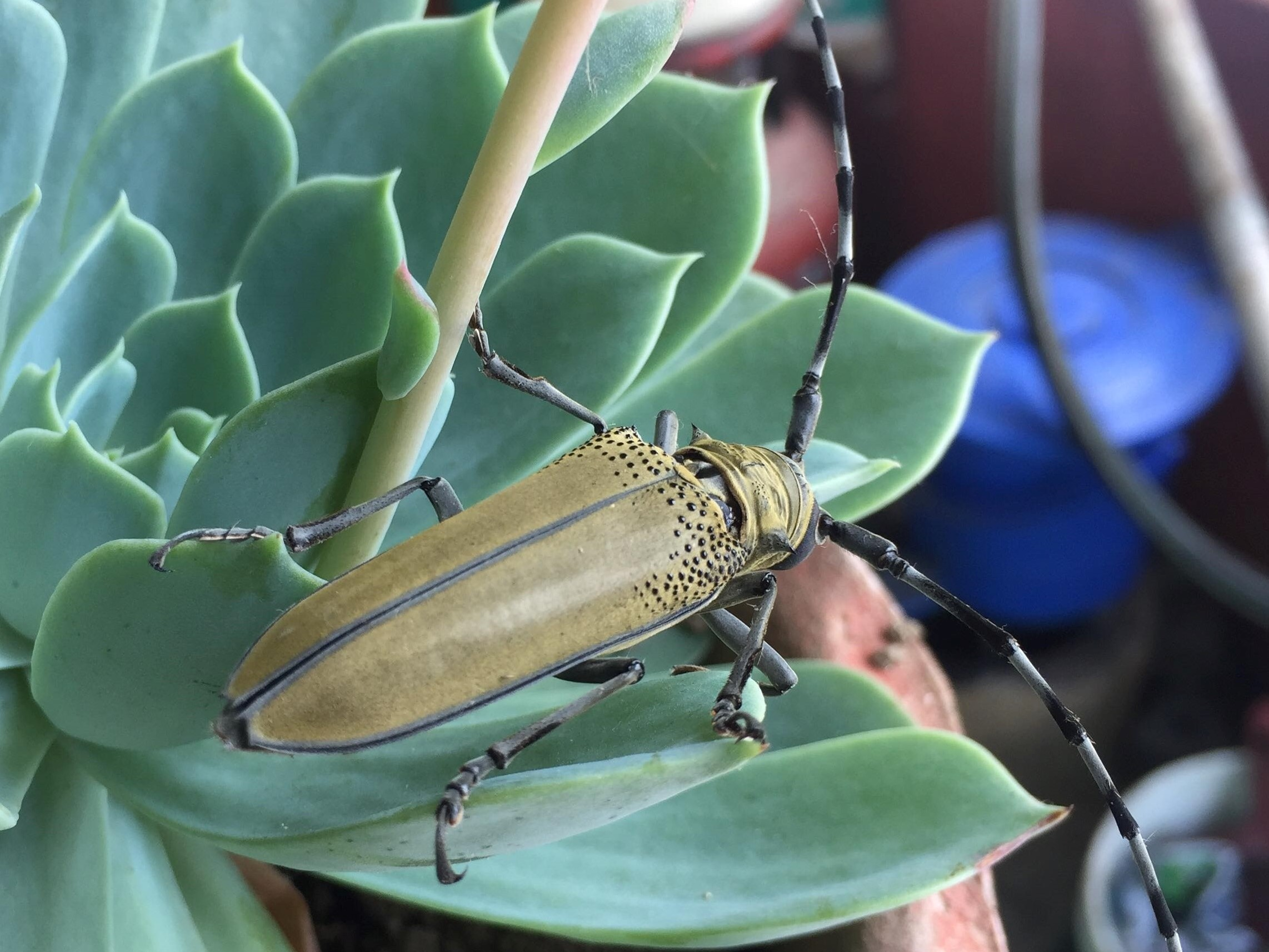
Apriona germari in Pokhara, Lakeside

  - Apriona parvigranula
  - Apriona sublaevis
- Batocera
  - Batocera horsfieldi
  - Batocera numitor
  - Batocera roylei
  - Batocera rubus
  - Batocera rufomaculata
- Aesopida malasiaca
- Agelasta
  - Agelasta bifasciana
  - Agelasta tonkinea
- Anagelasta apicalis
- Cacia cretifera
- Coptops
  - Coptops leucostictica
  - Coptops lichenea
- Falsomesosella
  - Falsomesosella bhutanensis
  - Falsomesosella gardneri
  - Falsomesosella rufovittata
- Mesocacia duplicaria
- Mesosa
  - Mesosa setulosa
  - Mesosa affinis nepalica
  - Mesosa gardneri
- Imantocera
  - Imantocera penicillata
  - Imantocera vicina
- Palimna palimnoides
- Palimnodes ducalis
- Olenecamptus
  - Olenecamptus anogeissi
  - Olenecamptus bilobus indianus
  - Olenecamptus multinotatus
  - Olenecamptus cf. serratus (possibly Olenecamptus serratus)
- Apomecyna
  - Apomecyna cretacea
  - Apomecyna histrio
  - Apomecyna leucosticta
  - Apomecyna naevia
  - Apomecyna saltator
- Atimura combreti
- Eunidia
  - Eunidia kumatai
  - Eunidia lateralis
- Hyagnis pakistanus
- Neosybra ochreovittata
- Ropica
  - Ropica honesta
  - Ropica lineatithorax
  - Ropica rosti
- Zorilispe harai
- Aulaconotus grammopterus
- Cleptometopus
  - Cleptometopus indistinctus
  - Cleptometopus mniszechii
  - Cleptometopus cf. olivaceus (possibly Cleptometopus olivaceus)
  - Cleptometopus parolivaceus
- Eucomatocera vittata
- Hippocephala argentistriata
- Hyllisia lineata
- Phelipara
  - Phelipara affinis
  - Phelipara indica
- Pothyne
  - Pothyne indica
  - Pothyne macrophthalma
  - Pothyne sikkimensis
  - Pothyne variegata
- Pseudocalamobius
  - Pseudocalamobius burmanensis
  - Pseudocalamobius luteonotatus
  - Pseudocalamobius obscuriscapus
  - Pseudocalamobius rufescens
  - Pseudocalamobius truncatus
- Tetraglenes hirticornis
- Xenolea asiatica
- Moechotypa asiatica
- Diastocera wallichii
- Ithocritus ruber
- Calothyrza margaritifera
- Desisa
  - Desisa quadriplagiata
  - Desisa subfasciata
- Egesina
  - Egesina anterufipennis
  - Egesina basirufa
  - Egesina cleroides
  - Egesina flavopicta
  - Egesina generosa
- Marmylaris
  - Marmylaris buckleyi
  - Marmylaris truncatipennis
- Niphona
  - Niphona fuscatrix
  - Niphona obscura
  - Niphona parallela
- Paramesosella stheniformis
- Paranaches simplex
- Pterolophia
  - Pterolophia brahma
  - Pterolophia brevegibbosa
  - Pterolophia carinata
  - Pterolophia dorsalis
  - Pterolophia krishna
  - Pterolophia lunigera
  - Pterolophia nigrovirgulata
  - Pterolophia obscurata
  - Pterolophia oculata
  - Pterolophia pedongensis
  - Pterolophia persimilis
  - Pterolophia phungi
  - Pterolophia postfasciculata
  - Pterolophia quadrifasciata
  - Pterolophia quadriplagiata
  - Pterolophia shiva
  - Pterolophia tibialis
  - Pterolophia transverseplagiata
  - Pterolophia zebrina
- Sthenias
  - Sthenias longeantennatus
  - Sthenias pseudodorsalis
- Zotalemimon
  - Zotalemimon bhutanensis
  - Zotalemimon sybroides
- Eupogoniopsis sepicola
- Falseunidia albosignata
- Miccolamia relucens
- Mimovitalisia wittmeri
- Mimozotale cylindrica
- Parasophronica cf. strandiella (possibly Parasophronica strandiella)
- Pareuseboides albomarmoratus
- Pseudanaesthetis assamensis
- Rhodopina
  - Rhodopina albomaculata
  - Rhodopina albomarmorata
  - Rhodopina alboplagiata
  - Rhodopina manipurensis
- Sophronica
  - Sophronica apicalis
  - Sophronica brunnea
  - Sophronica paupercula
- Cristosydonia alterna
- Cristenes sp.
- Exocentrus
  - Exocentrus alboguttatus
  - Exocentrus alboseriatus
  - Exocentrus alni
  - Exocentrus carissae
  - Exocentrus championi
  - Exocentrus cudraniae
  - Exocentrus dalbergiae
  - Exocentrus explanatidens
  - Exocentrus ficicola
  - Exocentrus flemingiae
  - Exocentrus grewiae
  - Exocentrus kleebergi
  - Exocentrus parcus
  - Exocentrus procerulus
  - Exocentrus pubescens
  - Exocentrus ravillus
  - Exocentrus specularis
  - Exocentrus tenellus
  - Exocentrus testaceus
  - Exocentrus transversifrons
- Ostedes prope brunneovariegata
- Paraclodia cf. besucheti (possibly Paraclodia besucheti)
- Pararhopaloscelides sericeipennis jumlaensis
- Pararondibilis
  - Pararondibilis acrosa
  - Pararondibilis eluta
- Pareoporis nigrosignata
- Pareryssamena fuscosignata
- Rondibilis
  - Rondibilis bastiana
  - Rondibilis bispinosa
  - Rondibilis pedongensis
  - Rondibilis plagiata
  - Rondibilis simillima
  - Rondibilis subundulata
- Sciades elongatus
- Trichemeopedus
  - Trichemeopedus calosus
  - Trichemeopedus holzschuhi
  - Trichohoplorana mutica
- Glenea
  - Glenea astathiformis
  - Glenea cancellata
  - Glenea capriciosa
  - Glenea indiana
  - Glenea momeitensis
  - Glenea pulchra
  - Glenea quatuordecimmaculata
  - Glenea spilota

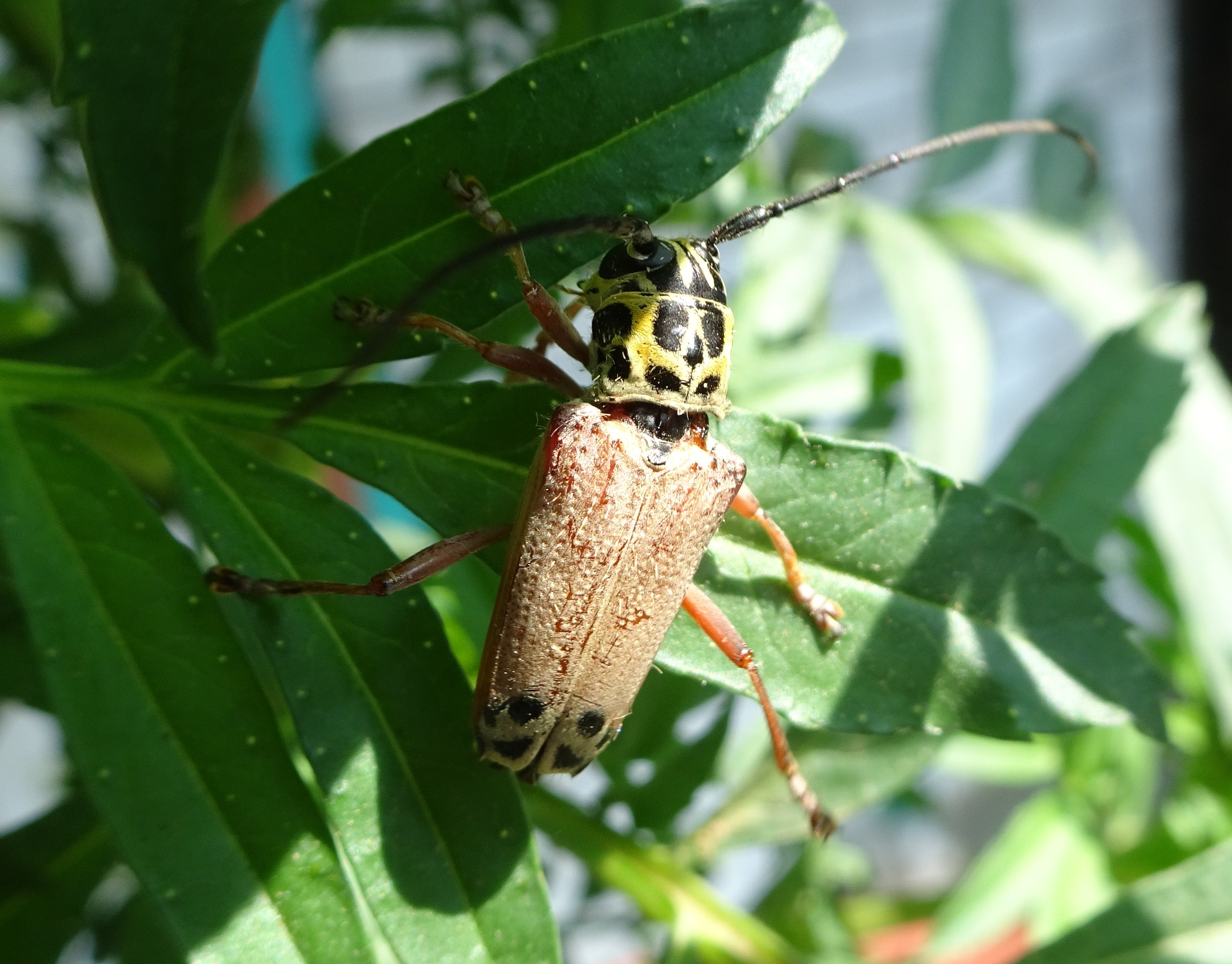
Glenea spilota in Pokhara, Lakeside

  - Glenea t-notata
  - Glenea vaga
  - Glenea virens bastiana
- Linda
  - Linda rubescens
  - Linda semiatra
  - Linda testacea
- Nupserha
  - Nupserha annulata
    - Nupserha annulata mustangensis
  - Nupserha basipilosa
  - Nupserha cauta
  - Nupserha dubia
  - Nupserha fricator
  - Nupserha fuscoapicalis
  - Nupserha lenita
  - Nupserha nigriceps
  - Nupserha pallidipennis
    - Nupserha pallidipennis flavipennis
  - Nupserha quadrioculata
  - Nupserha rotundicollis
  - Nupserha schmidi
    - Nupserha schmidi arunensis
    - Nupserha schmidi tambaensis
- Oberea
  - Oberea atropunctata
  - Oberea bootangensis
  - Oberea consentanea
  - Oberea ferruginea
  - Oberea himalayana
  - Oberea montivagans medioplagiata
  - Oberea nigriventris
  - Oberea posticata
  - Oberea pseudoposticata
- Obereopsis
  - Obereopsis annulicornis
  - Obereopsis atrosternalis
  - Obereopsis infranigra
  - Obereopsis limbata
  - Obereopsis longipes
  - Obereopsis luteicornis
  - Obereopsis modica
  - Obereopsis nepalensis
  - Obereopsis obscura nigroabdominalis
  - Obereopsis sericeoides
  - Obereopsis sikkimensis
  - Obereopsis trinotaticollis
- Phytoecia cf. kashmirica (possibly Phytoecia kashmirica)
- Serixia sp.
- Stibara tetraspilota
- Astathes violaceipennis
- Bacchisa frontalis
- Lasiophrys latifrons
- Momisis monticola
- Plaxomicrus
  - Plaxomicrus ellipticus
  - Plaxomicrus latus
- Nyctimenius tristis

== See also ==
- List of butterflies of Nepal
- Odonata of Nepal
- Zygaenidae of Nepal
- Wildlife of Nepal
