= Anomophysis plagiata =

Scientific classification
- Kingdom: Animalia
- Phylum: Arthropoda
- Class: Insecta
- Order: Coleoptera
- Suborder: Polyphaga
- Infraorder: Cucujiformia
- Family: Cerambycidae
- Genus: Anomophysis
- Species: A. plagiata

Binomial name
- Anomophysis plagiata (Waterhouse, 1884)

Synonyms
- Macrotoma plagiata Waterhouse, 1884; Macrotoma vidua Lameere, 1903; Macrotoma plagiata Gahan, 1906; Macrotoma (Zooblax) plagiata Lameere, 1913; Macrotoma (Zooblax) vidua Lameere, 1913; Macrotoma (Zooblax) plagiata Lameere, 1919; Macrotoma (Zooblax) crenata Gressitt & Rondon, 1970; Anomophysis plagiata Quentin & Villiers, 1981

Species of beetle

Anomophysis plagiata is a species of longhorn beetle native to Asia including Afghanistan, India, Pakistan, Sri Lanka, Nepal, Myanmar and Laos.
