= Glenea pulchra =

Scientific classification
- Domain: Eukaryota
- Kingdom: Animalia
- Phylum: Arthropoda
- Class: Insecta
- Order: Coleoptera
- Suborder: Polyphaga
- Infraorder: Cucujiformia
- Family: Cerambycidae
- Genus: Glenea
- Species: G. pulchra

Binomial name
- Glenea pulchra Aurivillius, 1926

Synonyms
- Glenea pulchella Thomson, 1860 nec Pascoe, 1858

Species of beetle

Glenea pulchra is a species of beetle in the family Cerambycidae. It was described by Per Olof Christopher Aurivillius in 1926. It has a wide distribution in Asia.
