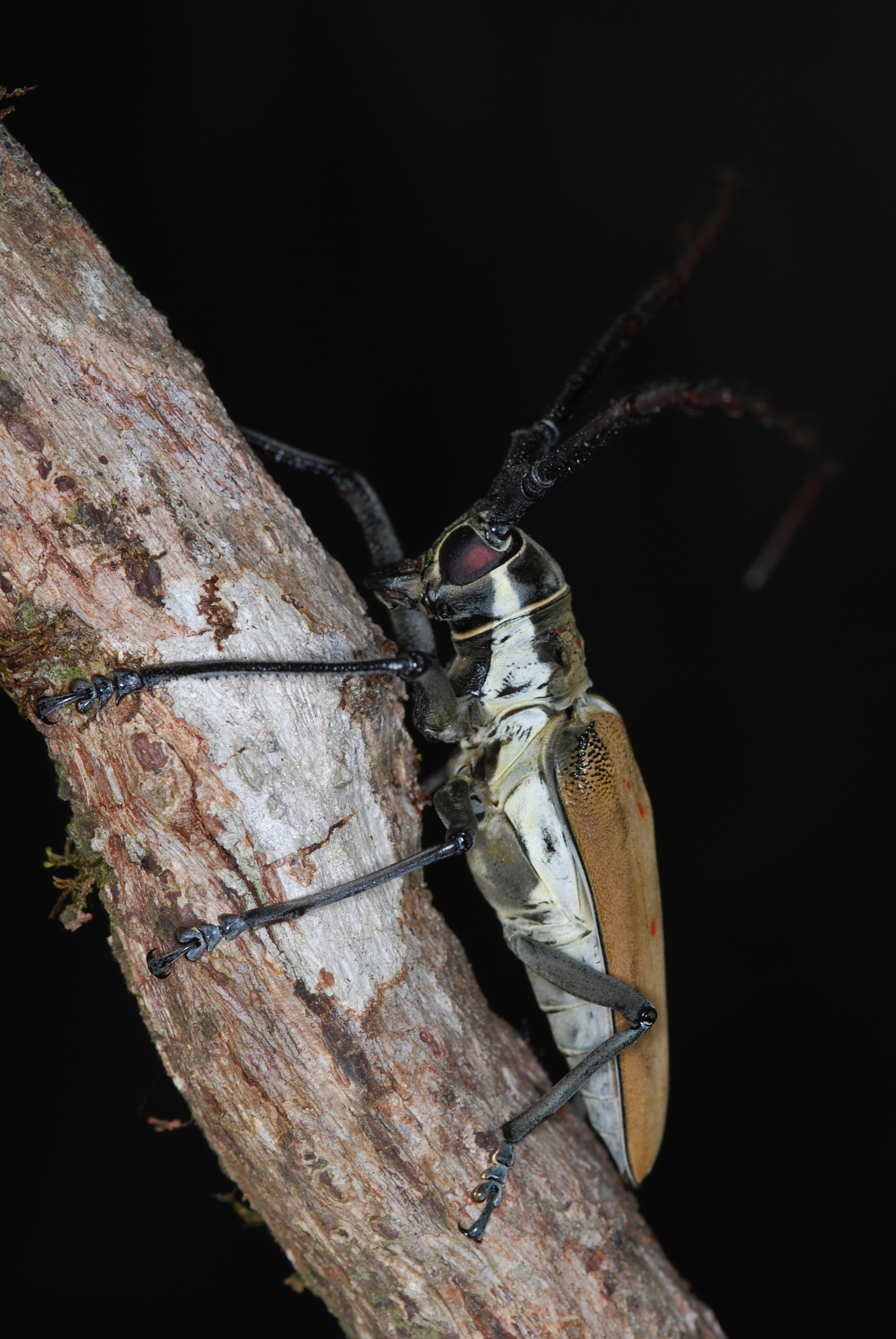

Scientific classification
- Kingdom: Animalia
- Phylum: Arthropoda
- Clade: Pancrustacea
- Class: Insecta
- Order: Coleoptera
- Suborder: Polyphaga
- Infraorder: Cucujiformia
- Family: Cerambycidae
- Genus: Batocera
- Species: B. numitor

Binomial name
- Batocera numitor Newman, 1842

= Batocera numitor =

Species of beetle

Batocera numitor, the mango-tree longicorn borer, is a species of beetle in the family Cerambycidae. It was described by Newman in 1842. It is known from China, Java, India, Laos, Nepal, Myanmar, the Philippines, Sulawesi, Sri Lanka, Thailand, Sumatra, and Vietnam. It feeds on plants including Mangifera indica and Quercus griffithii.

== Subspecies ==
- Batocera numitor ferruginea Thomson, 1858
- Batocera numitor loki Kriesche, 1915
- Batocera numitor numitor Newman, 1842
- Batocera numitor palawanicola Kriesche, 1928
- Batocera numitor sumatrensis Aurivillius, 1922
- Batocera numitor titana Thomson, 1895
