= Oberea consentanea =

Scientific classification
- Kingdom: Animalia
- Phylum: Arthropoda
- Class: Insecta
- Order: Coleoptera
- Suborder: Polyphaga
- Infraorder: Cucujiformia
- Family: Cerambycidae
- Genus: Oberea
- Species: O. consentanea

Binomial name
- Oberea consentanea Pascoe, 1867

Synonyms
- Oberea imbrevicollis Pic, 1928; Oberea posticata var. rufopyga Pic, 1926

Species of beetle

Oberea consentanea is a species of beetle in the family Cerambycidae. It was described by Francis Polkinghorne Pascoe in 1867. It is known from Borneo.

== Varieties ==
- Oberea consentanea var. posticalis Breuning, 1962
- Oberea consentanea var. mausoni Breuning, 1950
- Oberea consentanea var. unicolor Breuning, 1956
