= Acalolepta sikkimensis =

Scientific classification
- Kingdom: Animalia
- Phylum: Arthropoda
- Class: Insecta
- Order: Coleoptera
- Suborder: Polyphaga
- Infraorder: Cucujiformia
- Family: Cerambycidae
- Genus: Acalolepta
- Species: A. sikkimensis

Binomial name
- Acalolepta sikkimensis (Breuning, 1935)

Species of beetle

Acalolepta sikkimensis is a species of beetle in the family Cerambycidae. It was described by Stephan von Breuning in 1935.

== Subspecies ==
- Acalolepta sikkimensis nigrina Breuning, 1975
- Acalolepta sikkimensis rufoantennata Breuning, 1975
- Acalolepta sikkimensis sikkimensis (Breuning, 1935)
