= Nupserha annulata =

Scientific classification
- Domain: Eukaryota
- Kingdom: Animalia
- Phylum: Arthropoda
- Class: Insecta
- Order: Coleoptera
- Suborder: Polyphaga
- Infraorder: Cucujiformia
- Family: Cerambycidae
- Genus: Nupserha
- Species: N. annulata

Binomial name
- Nupserha annulata (Thomson, 1857)

Synonyms
- Stibara annulata Thomson, 1857

Species of beetle

Nupserha annulata is a species of beetle in the family Cerambycidae. It was described by James Thomson in 1857. The species is reported from Bhutan, India, Nepal and Pakistan.

== Subspecies ==
- Nupserha annulata annulata (Thomson, 1857)
- Nupserha annulata mustangensis Holzschuh, 1990
