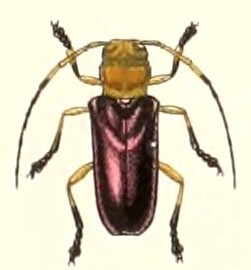

Scientific classification
- Kingdom: Animalia
- Phylum: Arthropoda
- Class: Insecta
- Order: Coleoptera
- Suborder: Polyphaga
- Infraorder: Cucujiformia
- Family: Cerambycidae
- Genus: Glenea
- Species: G. astathiformis

Binomial name
- Glenea astathiformis Breuning, 1958

Synonyms
- Accola citrina Jordan, 1894; Accolona citrina (Jordan, 1894)

= Glenea astathiformis =

Species of beetle

Glenea astathiformis is a species of beetle in the family Cerambycidae. It was described by Stephan von Breuning in 1958. It is known from Laos, India, China, and Nepal. It contains the varietas Glenea astathiformis var. viridicoerulea.
