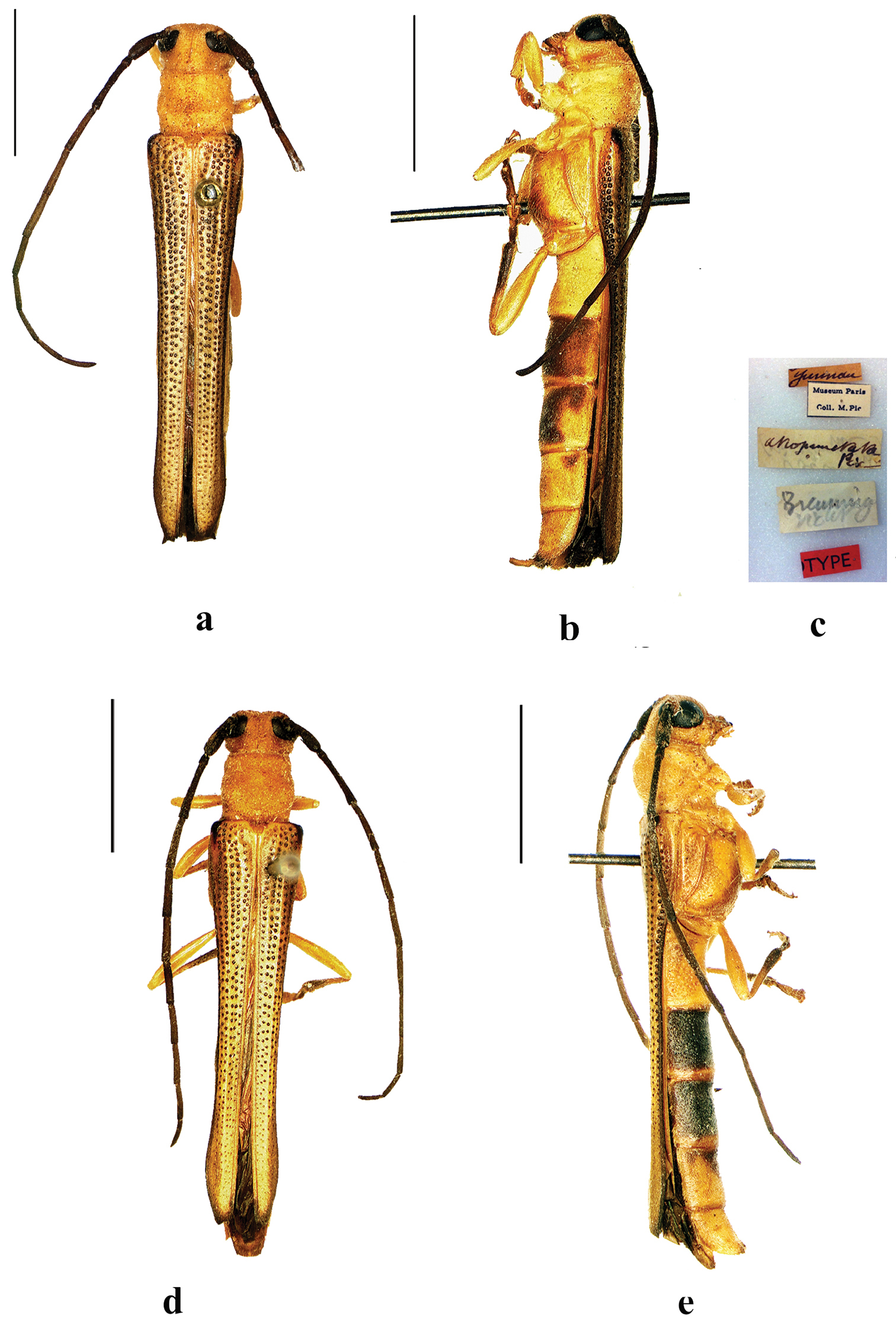

Scientific classification
- Kingdom: Animalia
- Phylum: Arthropoda
- Class: Insecta
- Order: Coleoptera
- Suborder: Polyphaga
- Infraorder: Cucujiformia
- Family: Cerambycidae
- Genus: Oberea
- Species: O. atropunctata

Binomial name
- Oberea atropunctata Pic, 1916

= Oberea atropunctata =

Species of beetle

Oberea atropunctata is a species of flat-faced longhorn beetle in the tribe Saperdini in the genus Oberea, described by Pic in 1916.
