= Acalolepta longicollis =

Scientific classification
- Domain: Eukaryota
- Kingdom: Animalia
- Phylum: Arthropoda
- Class: Insecta
- Order: Coleoptera
- Suborder: Polyphaga
- Infraorder: Cucujiformia
- Family: Cerambycidae
- Tribe: Lamiini
- Genus: Acalolepta
- Species: A. longicollis

Binomial name
- Acalolepta longicollis (Gilmour, 1956)

Synonyms
- Dihammus longicollis Gilmour, 1956

Species of beetle

Acalolepta longicollis is a species of beetle in the family Cerambycidae. It was described by E. Forrest Gilmour in 1956. It is known from Nepal.
