= Acalolepta freudei =

Scientific classification
- Domain: Eukaryota
- Kingdom: Animalia
- Phylum: Arthropoda
- Class: Insecta
- Order: Coleoptera
- Suborder: Polyphaga
- Infraorder: Cucujiformia
- Family: Cerambycidae
- Tribe: Lamiini
- Genus: Acalolepta
- Species: A. freudei

Binomial name
- Acalolepta freudei Heyrovsky, 1976

Species of beetle

Acalolepta freudei is a species of beetle in the family Cerambycidae. It was described by Leopold Heyrovský in 1976.
