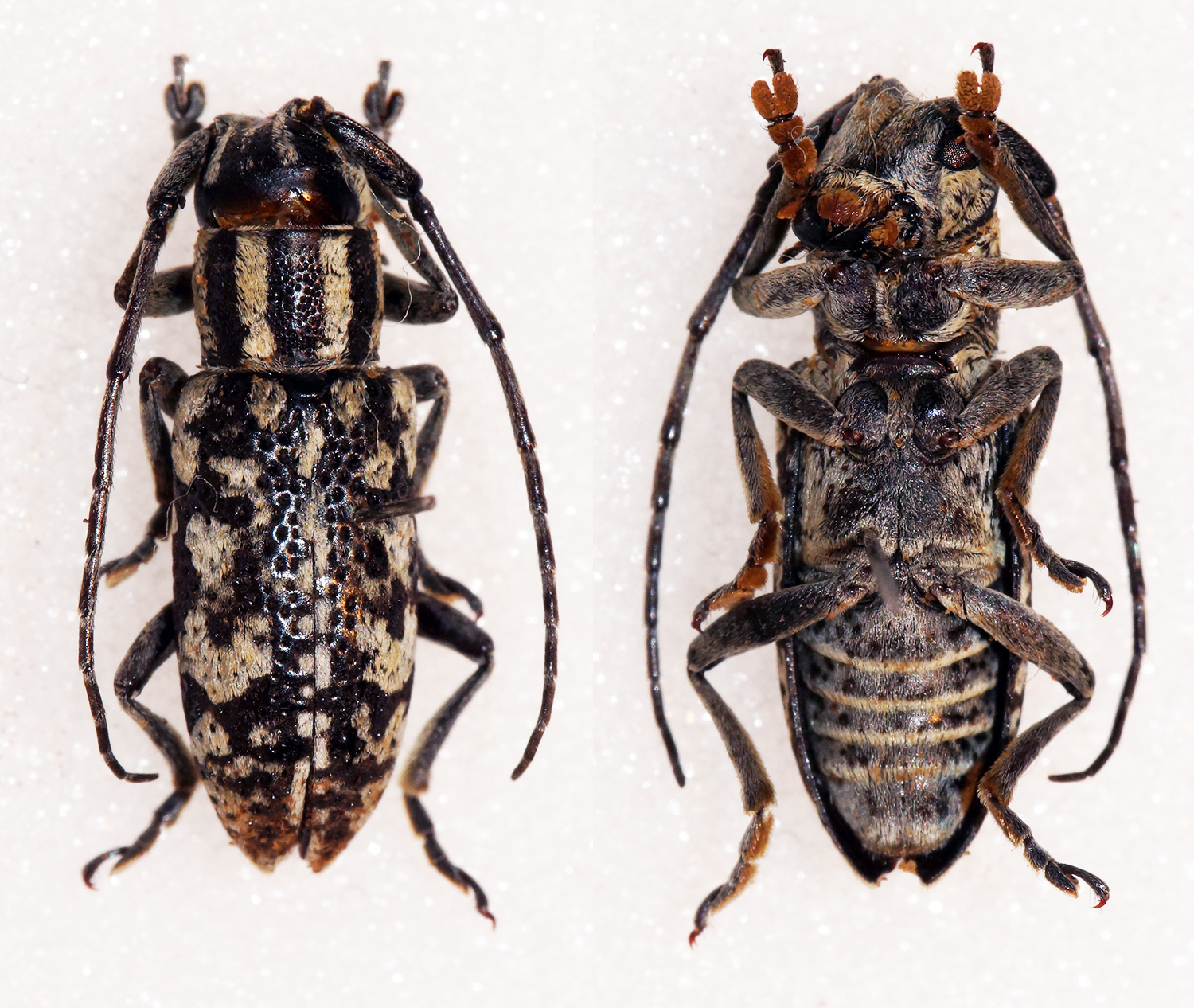

Scientific classification
- Domain: Eukaryota
- Kingdom: Animalia
- Phylum: Arthropoda
- Class: Insecta
- Order: Coleoptera
- Suborder: Polyphaga
- Infraorder: Cucujiformia
- Family: Cerambycidae
- Tribe: Pteropliini
- Genus: Pterolophia
- Species: P. zebrina

Binomial name
- Pterolophia zebrina (Pascoe, 1858)

Synonyms
- Lychrosis zebrinus (Pascoe, 1858); Hathlia zebrina Pascoe, 1858; Pterolophia (Lychrosis) zebrina (Pascoe, 1858)

= Pterolophia zebrina =

Species of beetle

Pterolophia zebrina is a species of beetle in the family Cerambycidae. It was described by Francis Polkinghorne Pascoe in 1858, originally under the genus Hathlia. It is known from India, China, Thailand, Taiwan, and Vietnam.
