= Acalolepta griseipennis =

Scientific classification
- Domain: Eukaryota
- Kingdom: Animalia
- Phylum: Arthropoda
- Class: Insecta
- Order: Coleoptera
- Suborder: Polyphaga
- Infraorder: Cucujiformia
- Family: Cerambycidae
- Tribe: Lamiini
- Genus: Acalolepta
- Species: A. griseipennis

Binomial name
- Acalolepta griseipennis (Thomson, 1857)

Synonyms
- Dihammus griseipennis Breuning, 1944; Monochamus griseipennis Thomson, 1857

Species of beetle

Acalolepta griseipennis is a species of beetle in the family Cerambycidae. It was described by James Thomson in 1857. It is known from Bhutan, Myanmar, India, Malaysia, and Laos.
