= Glenea cancellata =

Scientific classification
- Domain: Eukaryota
- Kingdom: Animalia
- Phylum: Arthropoda
- Class: Insecta
- Order: Coleoptera
- Suborder: Polyphaga
- Infraorder: Cucujiformia
- Family: Cerambycidae
- Genus: Glenea
- Species: G. cancellata

Binomial name
- Glenea cancellata Thomson, 1865

Species of beetle

Glenea cancellata is a species of beetle in the family Cerambycidae. It was described by James Thomson in 1865.
