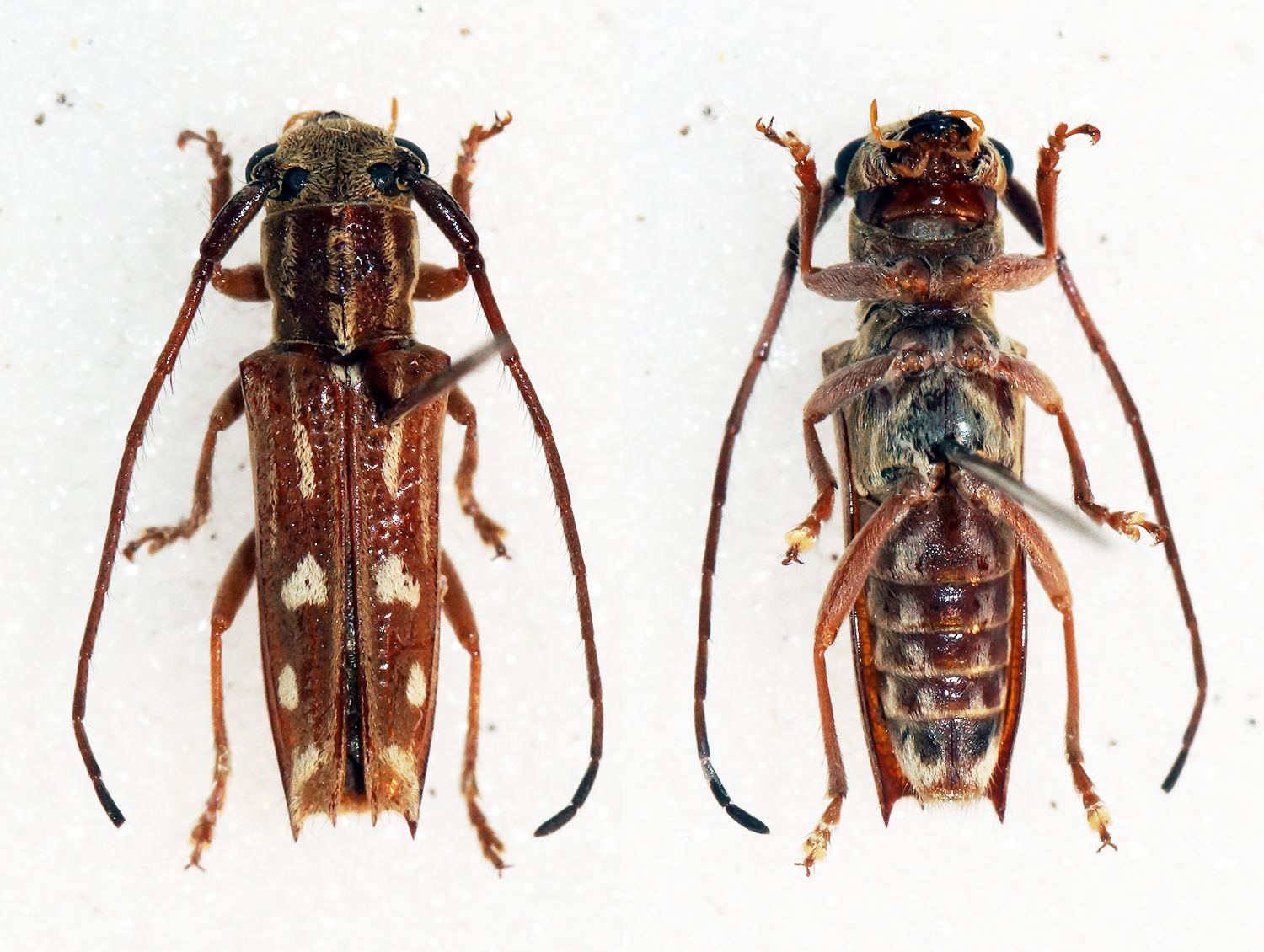

Scientific classification
- Domain: Eukaryota
- Kingdom: Animalia
- Phylum: Arthropoda
- Class: Insecta
- Order: Coleoptera
- Suborder: Polyphaga
- Infraorder: Cucujiformia
- Family: Cerambycidae
- Genus: Glenea
- Species: G. vaga

Binomial name
- Glenea vaga Thomson, 1865

= Glenea vaga =

Species of beetle

Glenea vaga is a species of beetle in the family Cerambycidae. It was described by James Thomson in 1865. It is known from Myanmar, Laos, Thailand and Malaysia. It contains the varietas Glenea vaga var. flavocolorata.
