= Oberea ferruginea =

Scientific classification
- Kingdom: Animalia
- Phylum: Arthropoda
- Clade: Pancrustacea
- Class: Insecta
- Order: Coleoptera
- Suborder: Polyphaga
- Infraorder: Cucujiformia
- Family: Cerambycidae
- Genus: Oberea
- Species: O. ferruginea

Binomial name
- Oberea ferruginea (Thunberg, 1787)

Synonyms
- Oberea notativentris Pic, 1924; Oberea atricornis Gressitt, 1951; Oberea maculiventris Pic, 1923; Saperda ferruginea Thunberg, 1787 nec Fabricius, 1781; Saperda elongata Olivier, 1795; Saperda tricornis Fabricius, 1792

Species of beetle

Oberea ferruginea is a species of beetle in the family Cerambycidae. It was described by Thunberg in 1787.

== Varietas ==
- Oberea ferruginea var. prolixa Pascoe, 1867
- Oberea ferruginea var. semiargentata Pic, 1923
