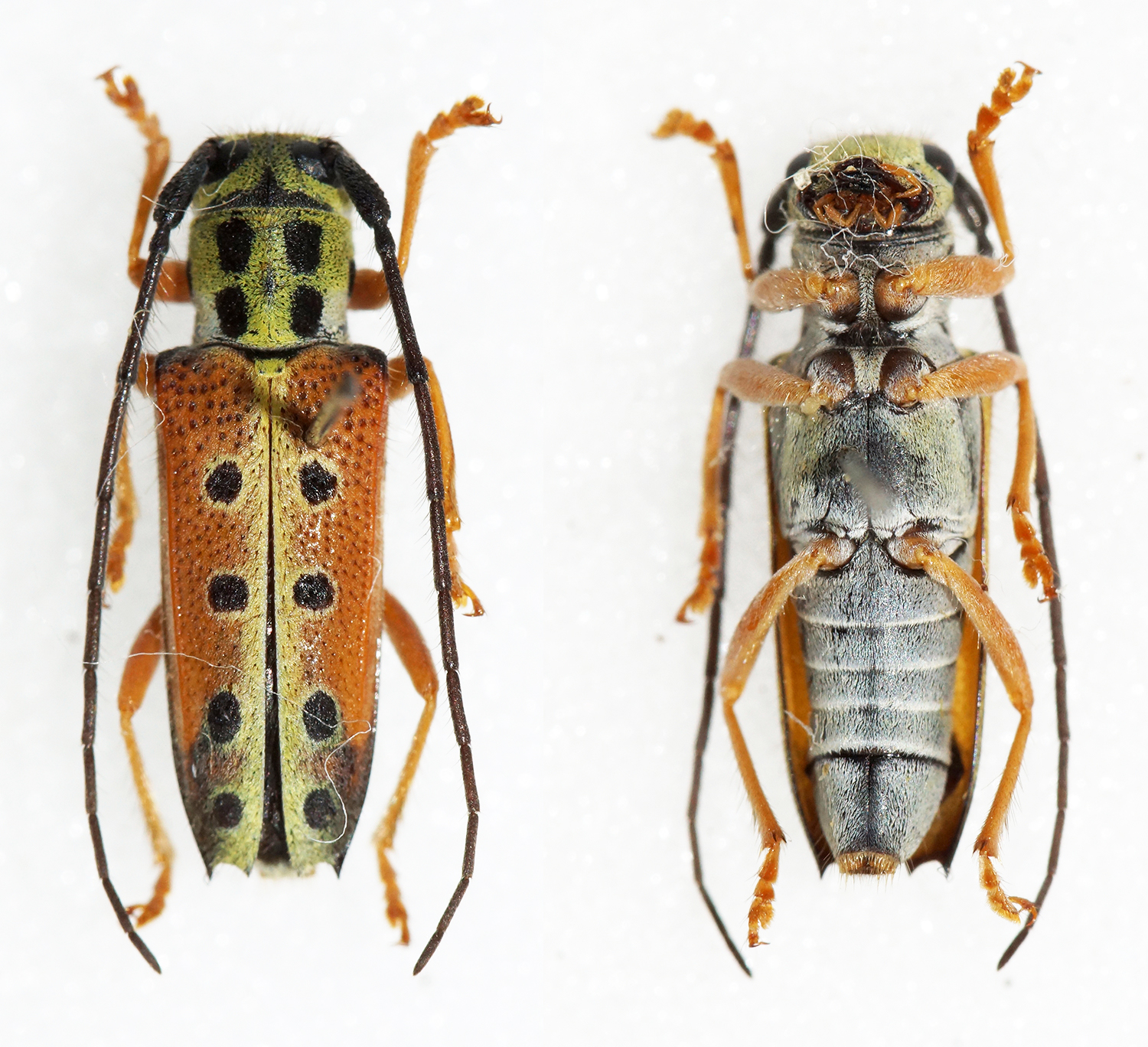

Scientific classification
- Domain: Eukaryota
- Kingdom: Animalia
- Phylum: Arthropoda
- Class: Insecta
- Order: Coleoptera
- Suborder: Polyphaga
- Infraorder: Cucujiformia
- Family: Cerambycidae
- Genus: Glenea
- Species: G. quatuordecimmaculata

Binomial name
- Glenea quatuordecimmaculata (Hope, 1831)

Synonyms
- Glenea argus Thomson, 1878; Stibara argus Thomson, 1857

= Glenea quatuordecimmaculata =

Species of beetle

Glenea quatuordecimmaculata is a species of beetle in the family Cerambycidae. It was described by Frederick William Hope in 1831. It is known from Nepal, Bhutan and India.
