= Paranaches =

Scientific classification
- Kingdom: Animalia
- Phylum: Arthropoda
- Class: Insecta
- Order: Coleoptera
- Suborder: Polyphaga
- Infraorder: Cucujiformia
- Family: Cerambycidae
- Tribe: Pteropliini
- Genus: Paranaches; Breuning, 1959
- Species: P. simplex

Binomial name
- Paranaches simplex (Pic, 1928)

Synonyms
- Anaches simplex Pic, 1928

Genus of beetles

Paranaches simplex is a species of beetle in the family Cerambycidae, and the only species in the genus Paranaches. P. simplex was described by Maurice Pic in 1928.

It is found in Nepal.
