= Paraclodia =

Scientific classification
- Kingdom: Animalia
- Phylum: Arthropoda
- Class: Insecta
- Order: Coleoptera
- Suborder: Polyphaga
- Infraorder: Cucujiformia
- Family: Cerambycidae
- Genus: Paraclodia
- Species: P. besucheti

Binomial name
- Paraclodia besucheti Breuning, 1974

Genus of beetles

Paraclodia besucheti is a species of beetle in the family Cerambycidae, and the only species in the genus Paraclodia. It was described by Breuning in 1974.
