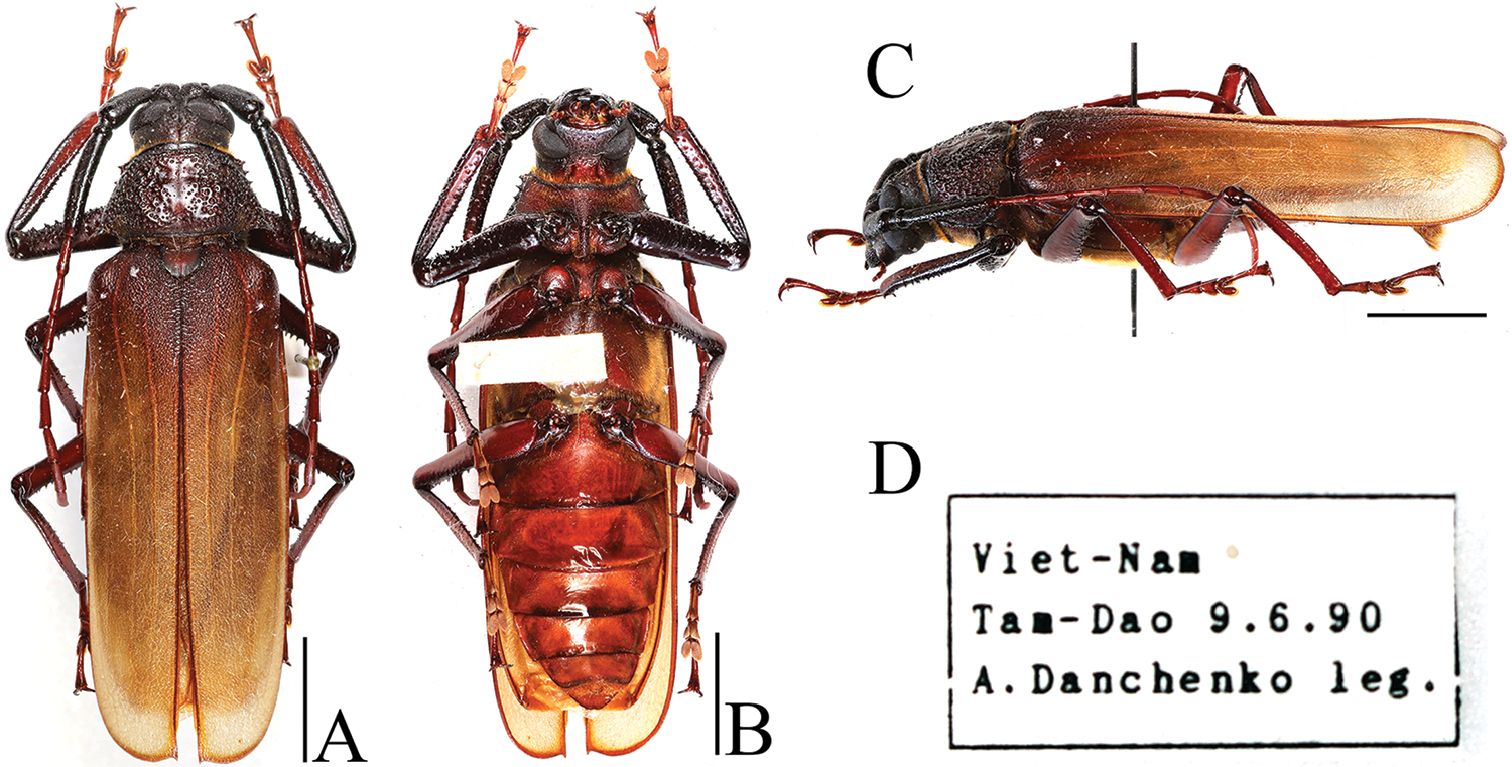

Scientific classification
- Kingdom: Animalia
- Phylum: Arthropoda
- Clade: Pancrustacea
- Class: Insecta
- Order: Coleoptera
- Suborder: Polyphaga
- Infraorder: Cucujiformia
- Family: Cerambycidae
- Genus: Bandar
- Species: B. pascoei

Binomial name
- Bandar pascoei (Lansberge, 1884)

Synonyms
- Macrotoma Pascoei Lansberge, 1884; Macrotoma luzonum Pascoe, 1869; Macrotoma fisheri Waterhouse, 1884; Macrotoma fisheri Gahan, 1906; Macrotoma (Bander) Fisheri Lameere, 1912; Macrotoma (Bander) Pascoei Lameere, 1912; Macrotoma (Bander) fisheri Gressitt, 1951; Macrotoma (Bander) fisheri ssp. khoi Hayashi, 1975; Macrotoma fischeri Heyrovsky, 1976; Bander pascoei pascoei Quentin & Villiers, 1981

= Bandar pascoei =

Species of beetle

Bandar pascoei is a species of longhorn beetle native to Asia with a wide range of distribution. The species is a delicacy in Thailand.

The species can be found from India and Sri Lanka, through China and Indo-China to Borneo and Java

The host plants of the larva include: Castanea mollissima, Diospyros kaki, Malus pumila, Pistacia chinensis, Prunus armeniaca, Prunus persica, Pyrus serotina and Quercus variabilis.

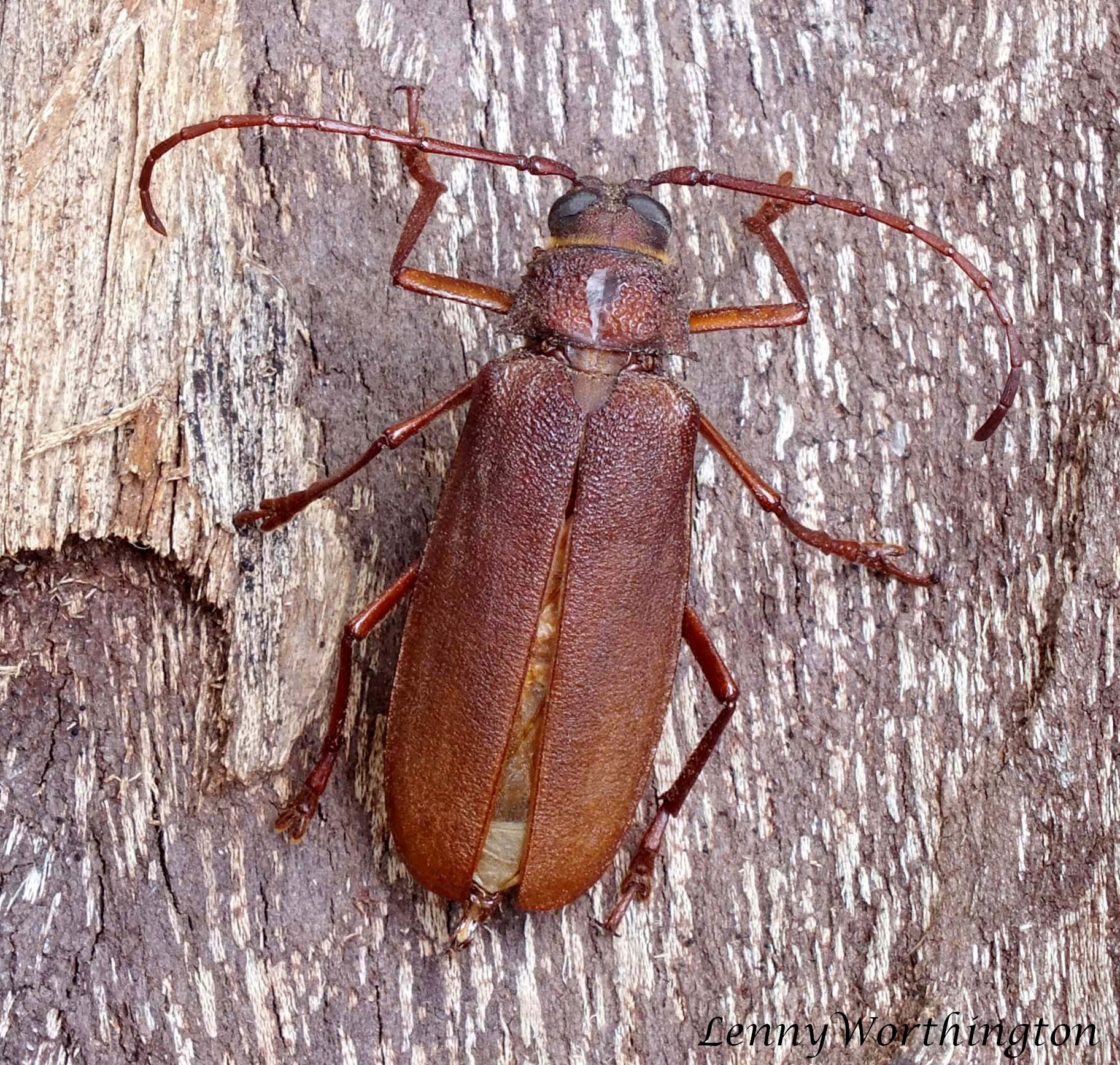
from Thailand

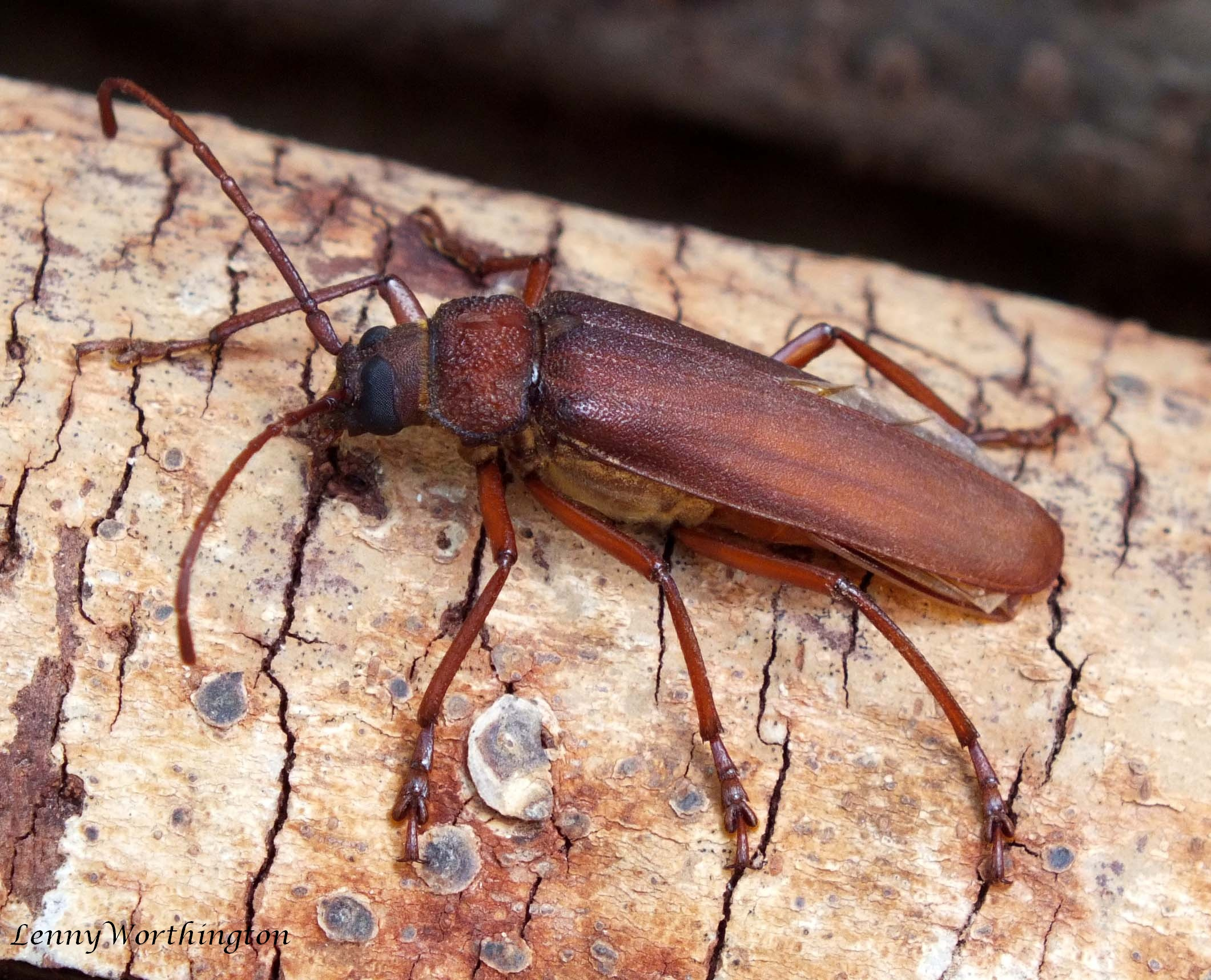
from Thailand

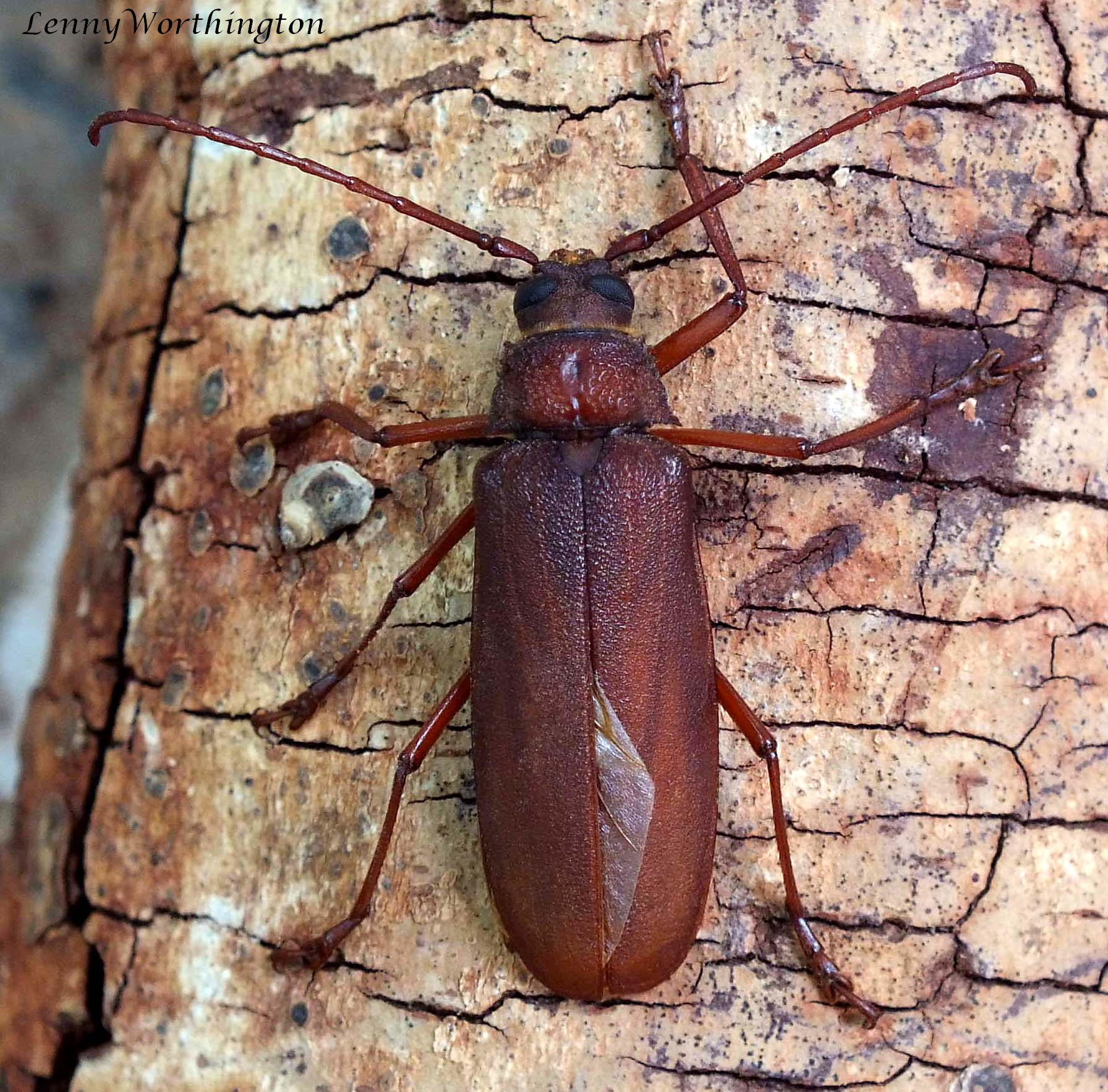
from Thailand

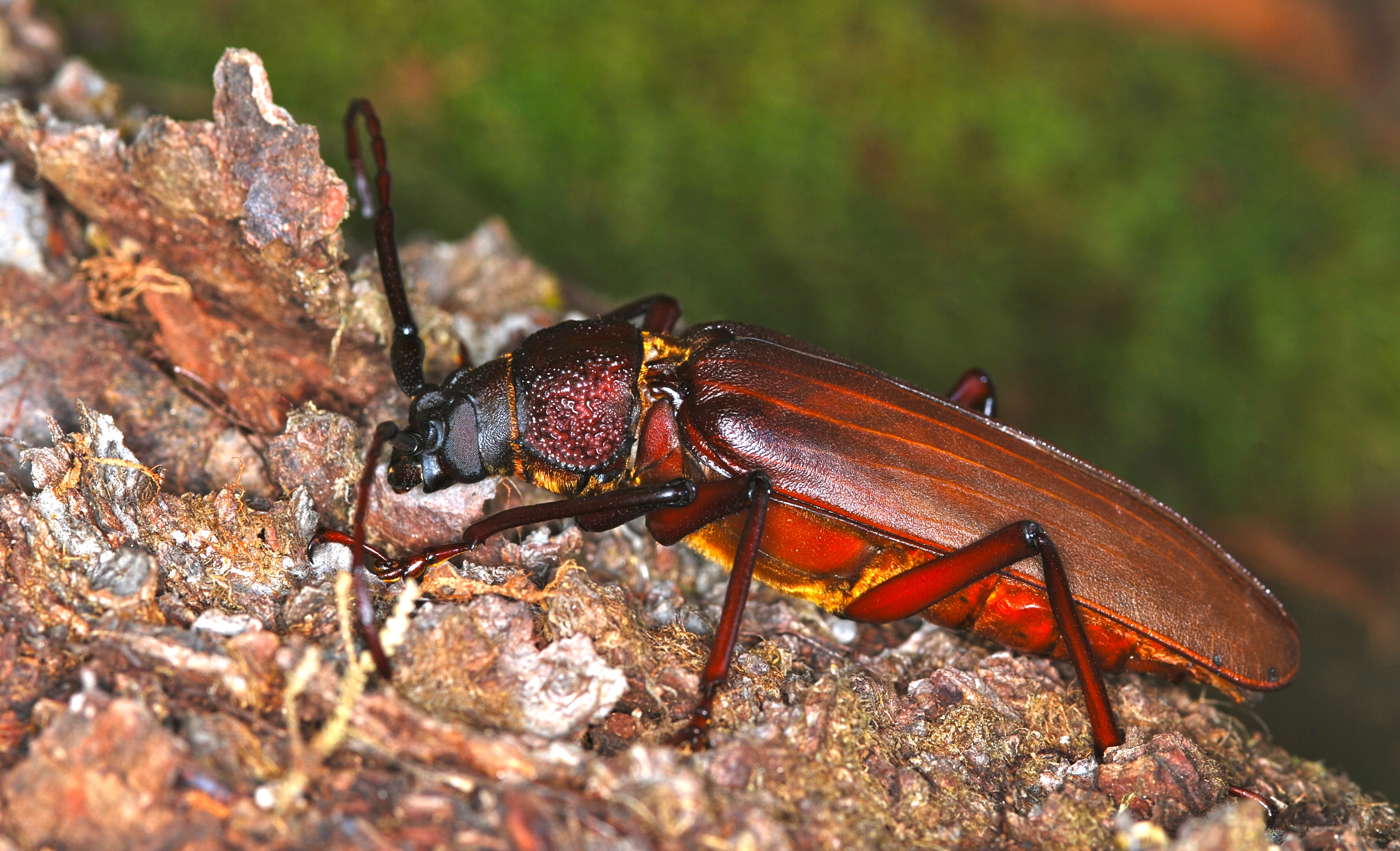
from Malaysia

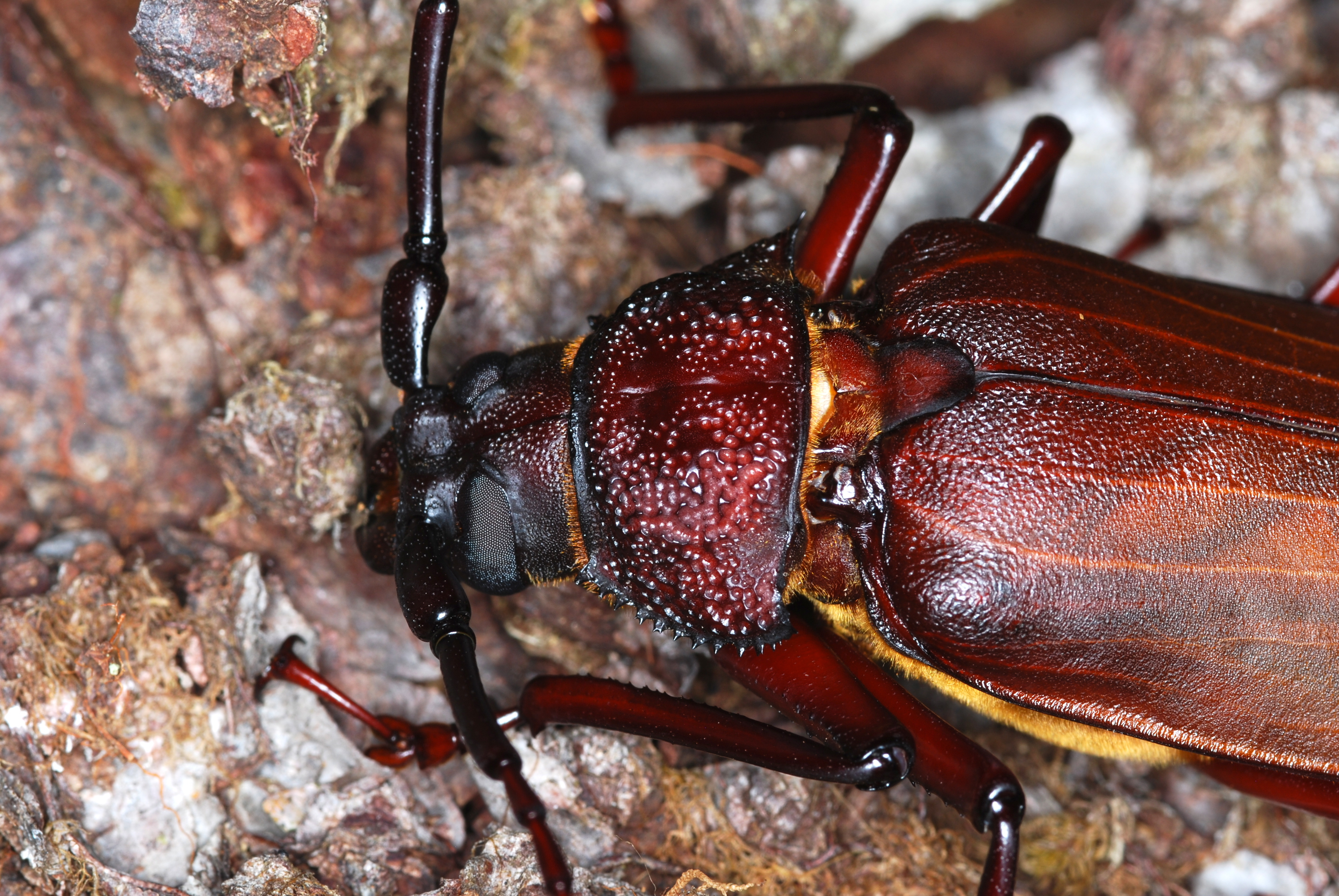
Head profile

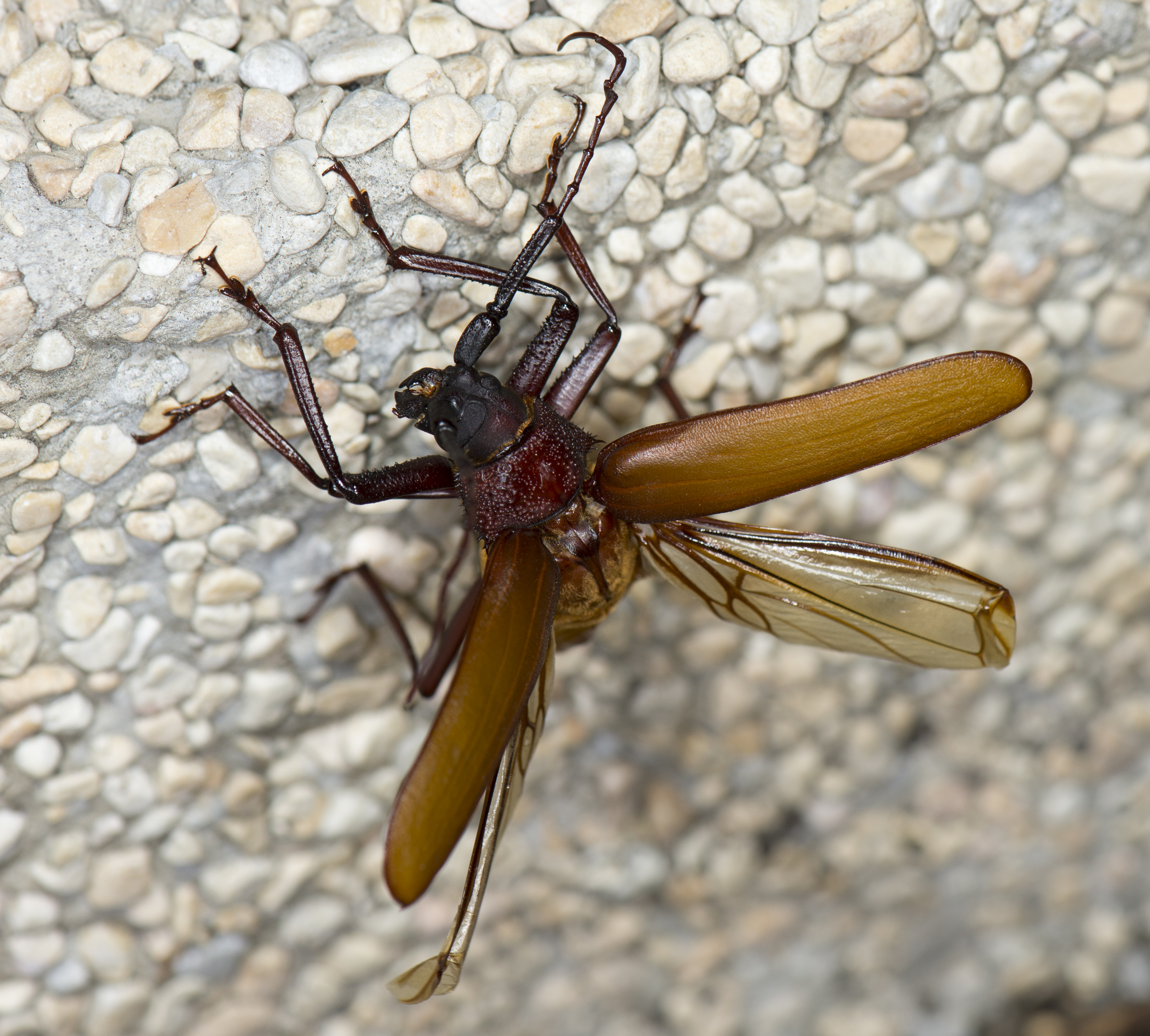
Elytra expanded

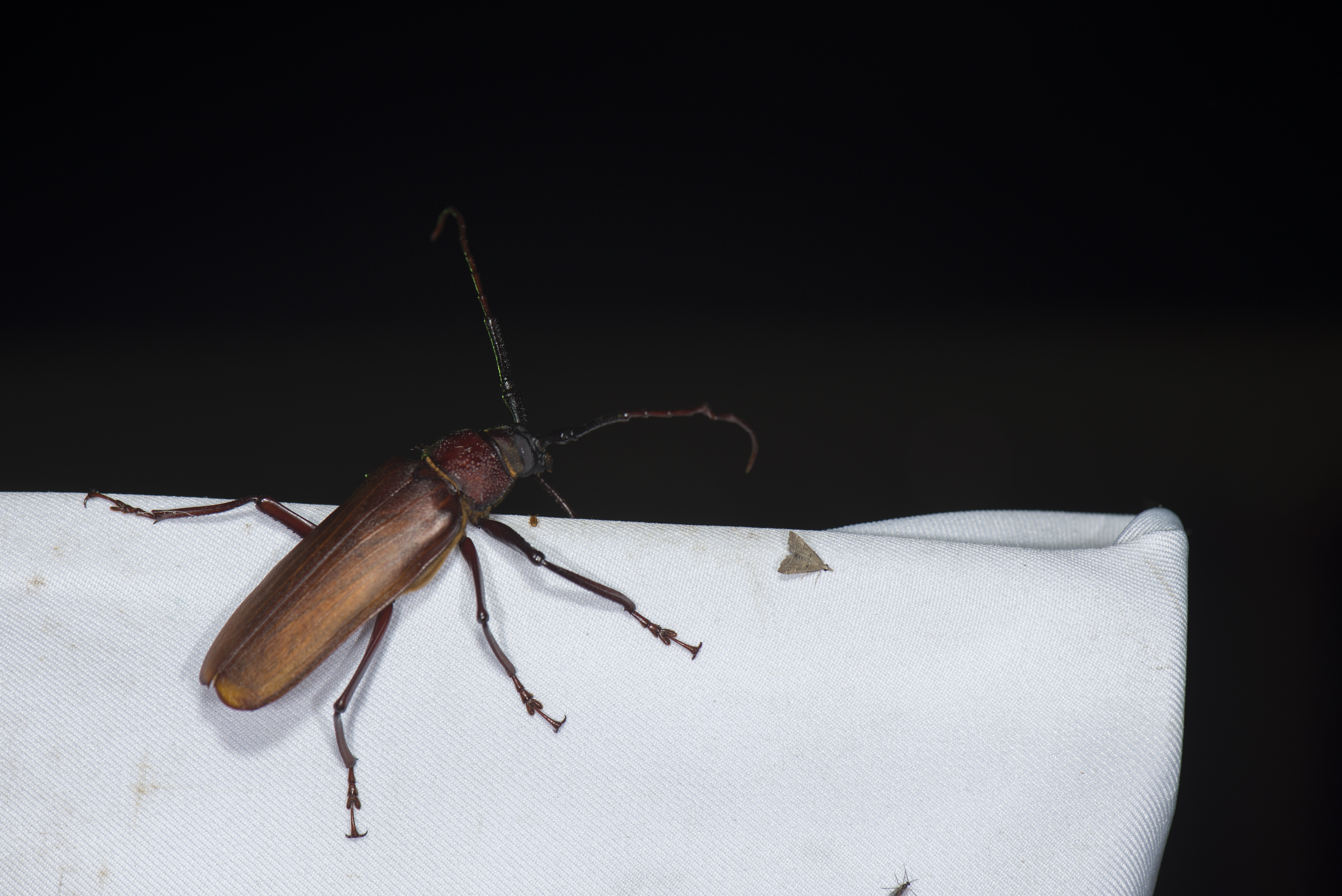
subspecies formosae
