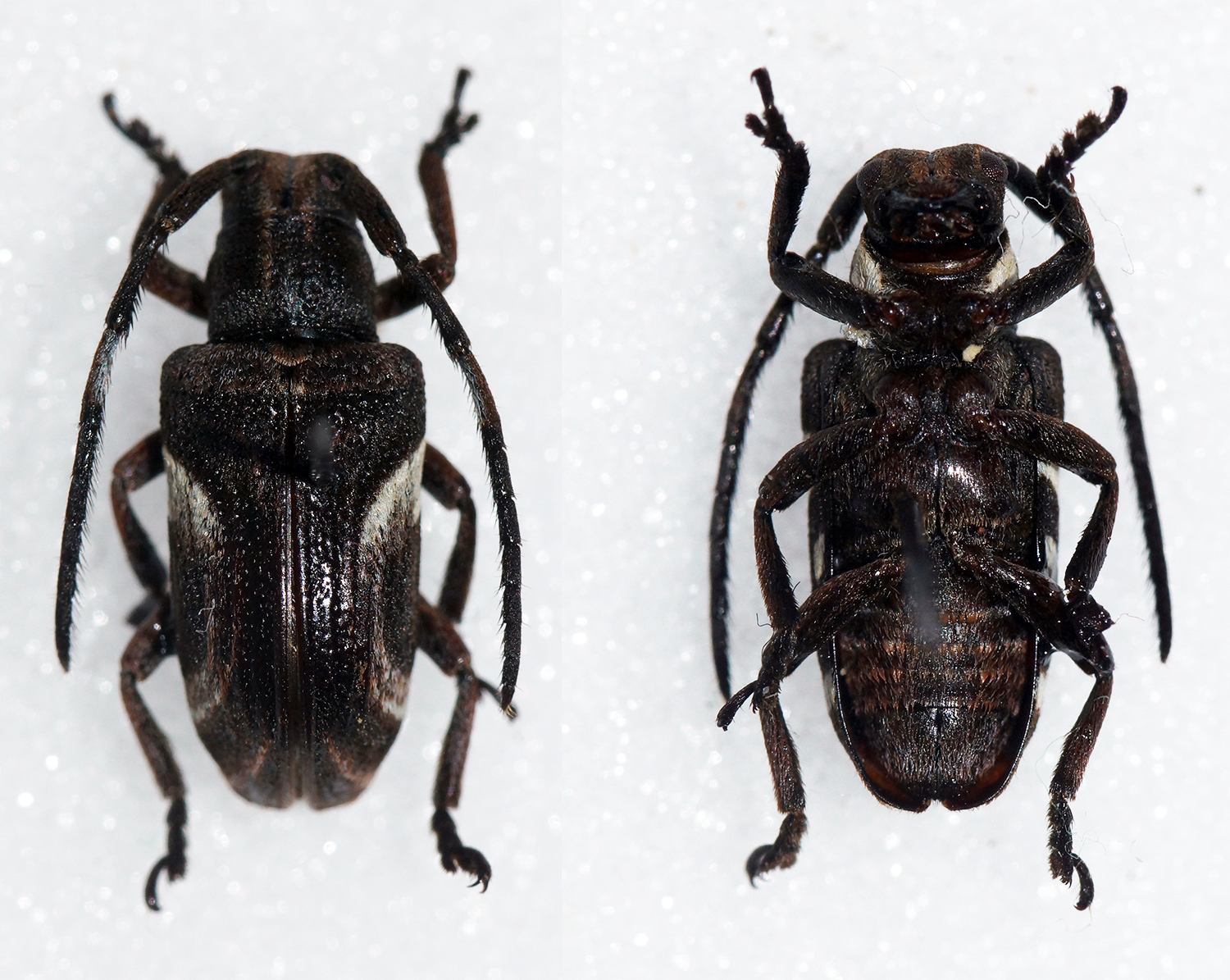
- Sex: Male. Size: 10mm

Scientific classification
- Kingdom: Animalia
- Phylum: Arthropoda
- Clade: Pancrustacea
- Class: Insecta
- Order: Coleoptera
- Suborder: Polyphaga
- Infraorder: Cucujiformia
- Family: Cerambycidae
- Genus: Pterolophia
- Species: P. lateralis

Binomial name
- Pterolophia lateralis Gahan, 1895

Synonyms
- Pterolophia lunigera Aurivillius, 1913

= Pterolophia lateralis =

Species of beetle

Pterolophia lateralis is a species of beetle in the family Cerambycidae. It was described by Charles Joseph Gahan in 1895. It has a wide distribution in Asia.

== Subspecies ==
- Pterolophia lateralis lateralis Gahan, 1895
- Pterolophia lateralis formosana Schwarzer, 1925
