= Glenea t-notata =

Scientific classification
- Domain: Eukaryota
- Kingdom: Animalia
- Phylum: Arthropoda
- Class: Insecta
- Order: Coleoptera
- Suborder: Polyphaga
- Infraorder: Cucujiformia
- Family: Cerambycidae
- Genus: Glenea
- Species: G. t-notata

Binomial name
- Glenea t-notata Gahan, 1889

Species of beetle

Glenea t-notata is a species of beetle in the family Cerambycidae. It was described by Charles Joseph Gahan in 1889. It is known from Nepal and Bangladesh.
