= Pterolophia brevegibbosa =

Scientific classification
- Kingdom: Animalia
- Phylum: Arthropoda
- Class: Insecta
- Order: Coleoptera
- Suborder: Polyphaga
- Infraorder: Cucujiformia
- Family: Cerambycidae
- Genus: Pterolophia
- Species: P. brevegibbosa

Binomial name
- Pterolophia brevegibbosa Pic, 1926

Species of beetle

Pterolophia brevegibbosa is a species of beetle in the family Cerambycidae. It was described in 1926 by Maurice Pic.
