= Pterolophia phungi =

Scientific classification
- Kingdom: Animalia
- Phylum: Arthropoda
- Class: Insecta
- Order: Coleoptera
- Suborder: Polyphaga
- Infraorder: Cucujiformia
- Family: Cerambycidae
- Genus: Pterolophia
- Species: P. phungi

Binomial name
- Pterolophia phungi (Pic, 1925)

Synonyms
- Pterolophia (Mimoron) phungi (Pic, 1925)

Species of beetle

Pterolophia phungi is a species of beetle in the family Cerambycidae. It was described by Maurice Pic in 1925.
