= Eunidia lateralis =

Scientific classification
- Kingdom: Animalia
- Phylum: Arthropoda
- Clade: Pancrustacea
- Class: Insecta
- Order: Coleoptera
- Suborder: Polyphaga
- Infraorder: Cucujiformia
- Family: Cerambycidae
- Genus: Eunidia
- Species: E. lateralis

Binomial name
- Eunidia lateralis Gahan, 1893

Synonyms
- Aserixia cincta Pic, 1926

Species of beetle

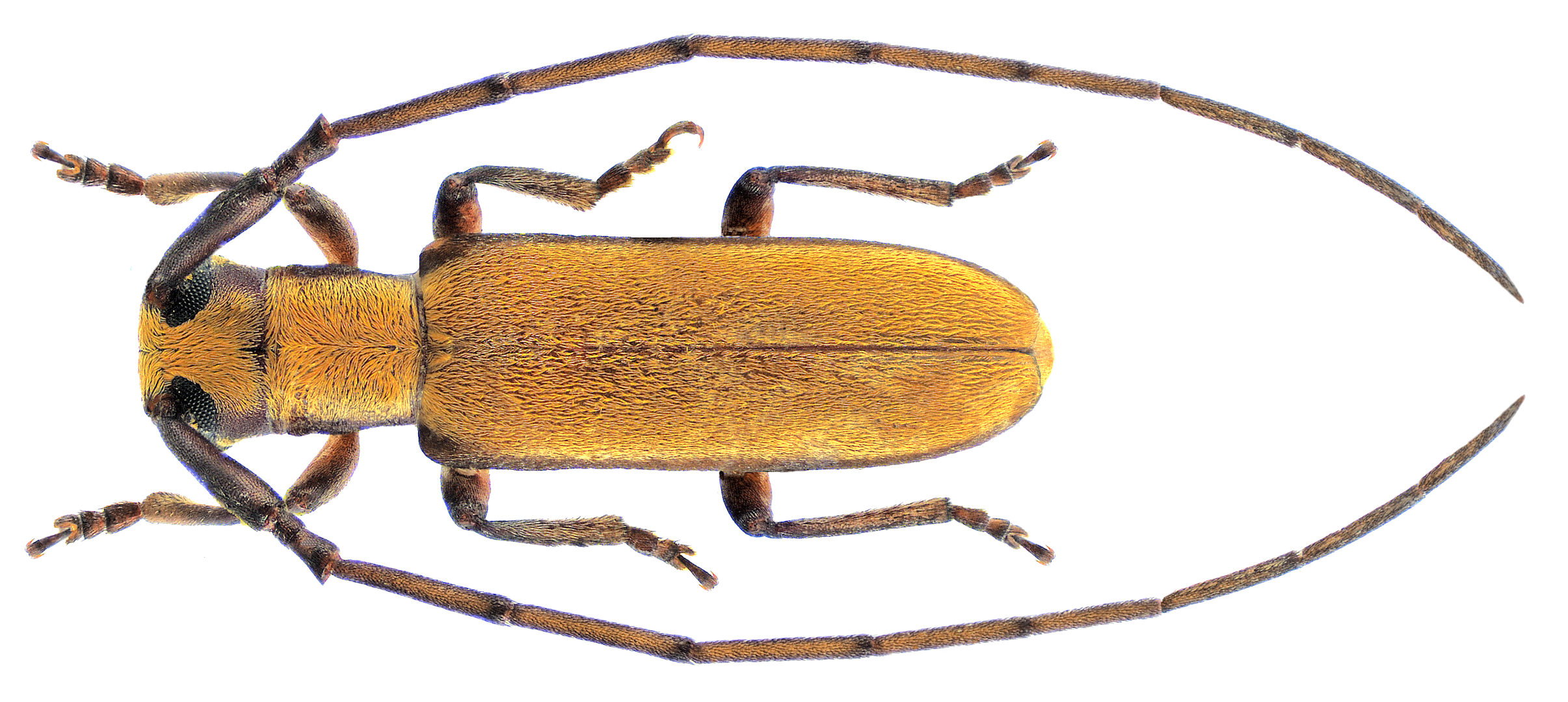

Eunidia lateralis is a species of beetle in the family Cerambycidae. It was described by Charles Joseph Gahan in 1893.
