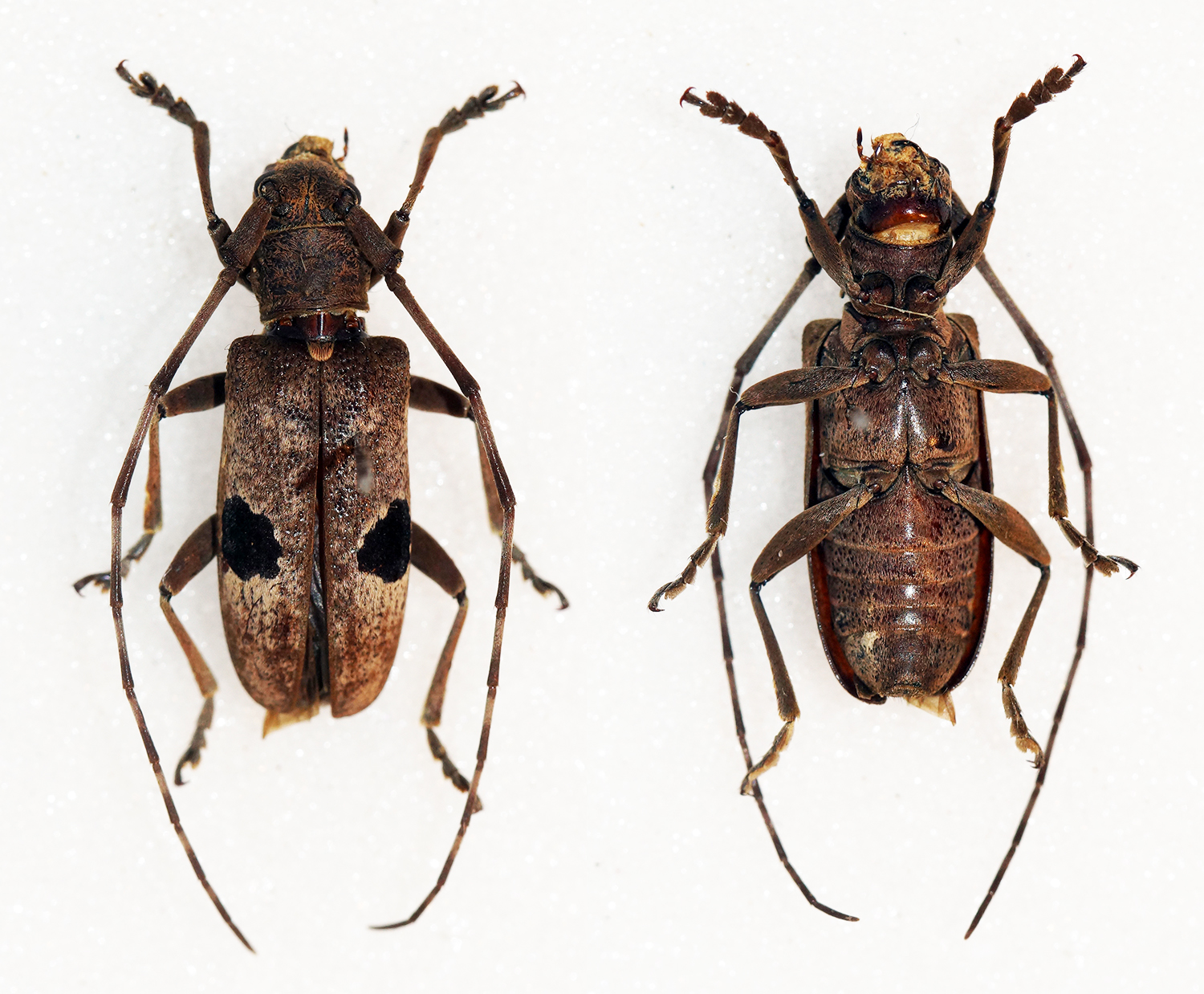

Scientific classification
- Domain: Eukaryota
- Kingdom: Animalia
- Phylum: Arthropoda
- Class: Insecta
- Order: Coleoptera
- Suborder: Polyphaga
- Infraorder: Cucujiformia
- Family: Cerambycidae
- Tribe: Lamiini
- Genus: Monochamus
- Species: M. bimaculatus

Binomial name
- Monochamus bimaculatus Gahan, 1888

= Monochamus bimaculatus =

Species of beetle

Monochamus bimaculatus is a species of beetle in the family Cerambycidae. It was described by Charles Joseph Gahan in 1888. It is known from Myanmar, Vietnam, India, Malaysia, Taiwan, Laos, and Thailand. It contains the varietas Monochamus bimaculatus var. ingranulatus.

It feeds on Cinnamomum camphora and Mallotus philippensis.
