= Nupserha schmidi =

Scientific classification
- Kingdom: Animalia
- Phylum: Arthropoda
- Class: Insecta
- Order: Coleoptera
- Suborder: Polyphaga
- Infraorder: Cucujiformia
- Family: Cerambycidae
- Genus: Nupserha
- Species: N. schmidi

Binomial name
- Nupserha schmidi Breuning, 1966

Species of beetle

Nupserha schmidi is a species of beetle in the family Cerambycidae. It was described by Stephan von Breuning in 1966.

== Subspecies ==
- Nupserha schmidi tambaensis Holzschuh, 1990
- Nupserha schmidi darjeelingensis Holzschuh, 1990
- Nupserha schmidi schmidi Breuning, 1966
- Nupserha schmidi arunensis Holzschuh, 1990
