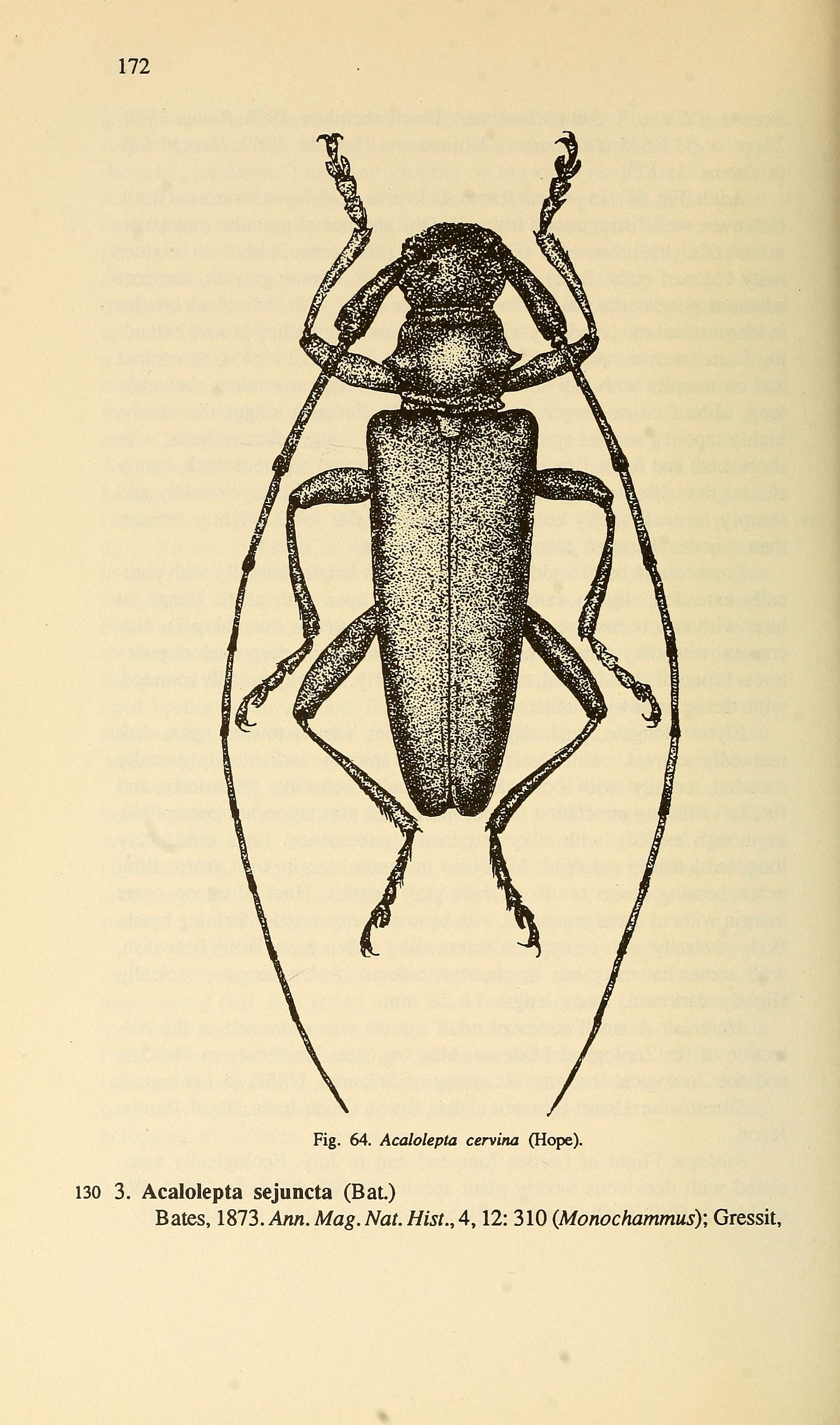

Scientific classification
- Domain: Eukaryota
- Kingdom: Animalia
- Phylum: Arthropoda
- Class: Insecta
- Order: Coleoptera
- Suborder: Polyphaga
- Infraorder: Cucujiformia
- Family: Cerambycidae
- Tribe: Lamiini
- Genus: Acalolepta
- Species: A. cervina

Binomial name
- Acalolepta cervina (Hope, 1831)

Synonyms
- Dihammus cervinus (Hope, 1831); Monohammus cervinus Hope, 1831; Acalolepta cervinus (Hope, 1831) (misspelling)

= Acalolepta cervina =

Species of beetle

Acalolepta cervina is a species of longhorn beetle in the family Cerambycidae. It was described by Frederick William Hope in 1831. It is known from India, China, Myanmar, Laos, and Nepal.
