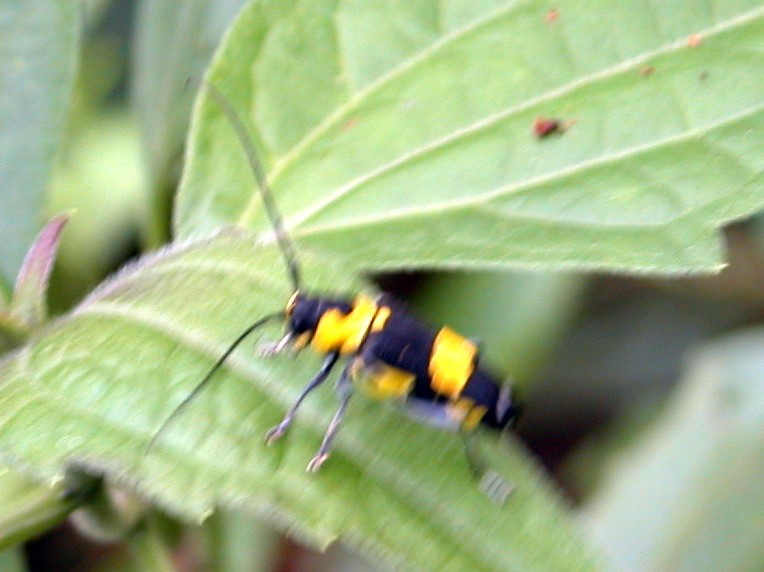

Scientific classification
- Kingdom: Animalia
- Phylum: Arthropoda
- Clade: Pancrustacea
- Class: Insecta
- Order: Coleoptera
- Suborder: Polyphaga
- Infraorder: Cucujiformia
- Family: Cerambycidae
- Genus: Glenea
- Species: G. indiana

Binomial name
- Glenea indiana (Thomson, 1857)

Synonyms
- Stibara indiana Thomson, 1857

= Glenea indiana =

Species of beetle

Glenea indiana is a species of beetle in the family Cerambycidae. It was first described by James Thomson in 1857 in the genus Stibara. It is known from India, Myanmar, Bhutan, Malaysia, and Nepal.
