= Oberea nigriventris =

Scientific classification
- Domain: Eukaryota
- Kingdom: Animalia
- Phylum: Arthropoda
- Class: Insecta
- Order: Coleoptera
- Suborder: Polyphaga
- Infraorder: Cucujiformia
- Family: Cerambycidae
- Genus: Oberea
- Species: O. nigriventris

Binomial name
- Oberea nigriventris Bates, 1873

Species of beetle

Oberea nigriventris is a species of beetle in the family Cerambycidae. It was described by Henry Walter Bates in 1873. It is known from Malaysia, Japan, Laos, Vietnam, China, Myanmar, and Taiwan.

== Subspecies ==
- Oberea nigriventris tenuata Pascoe, 1866
- Oberea nigriventris nigriventris Bates, 1873
