= Chlorophorus annulatus =

Scientific classification
- Domain: Eukaryota
- Kingdom: Animalia
- Phylum: Arthropoda
- Class: Insecta
- Order: Coleoptera
- Suborder: Polyphaga
- Infraorder: Cucujiformia
- Family: Cerambycidae
- Genus: Chlorophorus
- Species: C. annulatus

Binomial name
- Chlorophorus annulatus (Hope, 1831)

Species of beetle

Chlorophorus annulatus is a species of beetle in the family Cerambycidae. It was described by Hope in 1831.
