= Pterolophia postfasciculata =

Scientific classification
- Kingdom: Animalia
- Phylum: Arthropoda
- Clade: Pancrustacea
- Class: Insecta
- Order: Coleoptera
- Suborder: Polyphaga
- Infraorder: Cucujiformia
- Family: Cerambycidae
- Genus: Pterolophia
- Species: P. postfasciculata

Binomial name
- Pterolophia postfasciculata Pic, 1934

Synonyms
- Pterolophia gerardiniae Breuning, 1938; Pterolophia subfasciculata Breuning, 1938; Pterolophia (Hylobrotus) postfasciculata Pic, 1934; Pterolophia arctofasciata Gressitt, 1940

Species of beetle

Pterolophia postfasciculata is a species of beetle in the family Cerambycidae. It was described by Maurice Pic in 1934. It is known from China.
