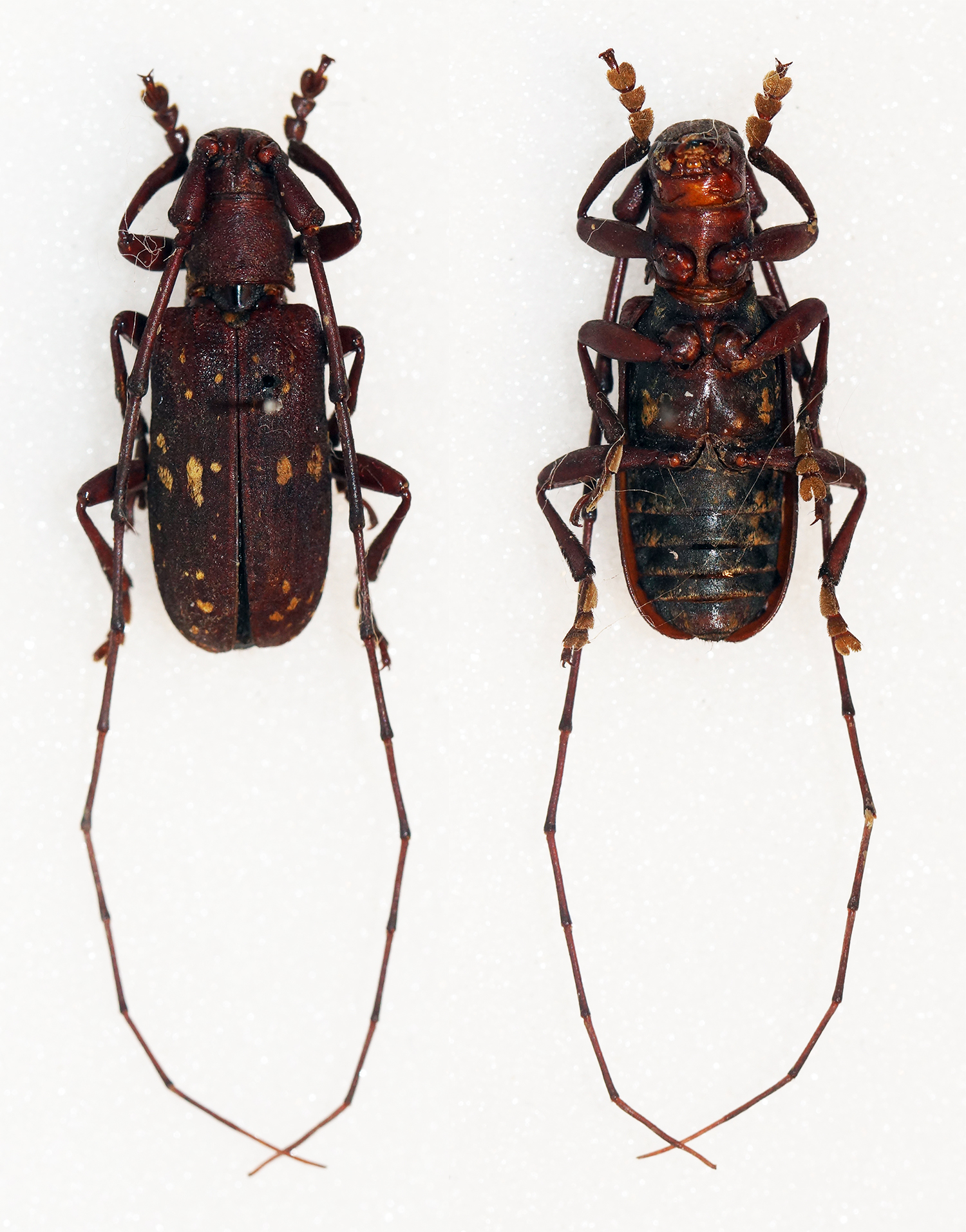

Scientific classification
- Domain: Eukaryota
- Kingdom: Animalia
- Phylum: Arthropoda
- Class: Insecta
- Order: Coleoptera
- Suborder: Polyphaga
- Infraorder: Cucujiformia
- Family: Cerambycidae
- Tribe: Lamiini
- Genus: Monochamus
- Species: M. dubius

Binomial name
- Monochamus dubius Gahan, 1894

Synonyms
- Monochamus sintikensis Matsushita, 1939; Monohammus dubius Gahan, 1895

= Monochamus dubius =

Species of beetle

Monochamus dubius is a species of beetle in the family Cerambycidae. It was described by Charles Joseph Gahan in 1894. It is known from India, Thailand, Myanmar, Vietnam, Taiwan, and China.

== Varietas ==
- Monochamus dubius var. luteovittatus Breuning, 1944
- Monochamus dubius var. sparsenotatus Pic, 1920
