= Ancylonotini =

Scientific classification
- Domain: Eukaryota
- Kingdom: Animalia
- Phylum: Arthropoda
- Class: Insecta
- Order: Coleoptera
- Suborder: Polyphaga
- Infraorder: Cucujiformia
- Family: Cerambycidae
- Subfamily: Lamiinae
- Tribe: Ancylonotini; Lacordaire, 1869

Tribe of beetles

Ancylonotini is a tribe of longhorn beetles of the subfamily Lamiinae. It was described by Lacordaire in 1869.

== Taxonomy ==
- Agranolamia Baguena, 1952
- Ancylonotopsis Breuning, 1938
- Ancylonotus Dejean, 1835
- Apalimnodes Franz, 1966
- Cnemolia Jordan, 1903
- Cnemolioides Breuning, 1938
- Dorcoeax Breuning, 1945
- Falsidactus Breuning, 1938
- Gigantopalimna Breuning, 1964
- Haploeax Aurivillius, 1907
- Idactus Pascoe, 1864
- Lasiopezus Pascoe, 1895
- Latisternum Jordan, 1894
- Mimocularia Breuning, 1970
- Mimopezus Breuning, 1970
- Oeax Pascoe, 1864
- Palimna Pascoe, 1862
- Palimnodes Breuning, 1938
- Paraderpas Breuning, 1968
- Paralatisternum Breuning, 1963
- Parapezus Breuning, 1938
- Paridactus Gahan, 1898
- Paroeax Jordan, 1903
- Parorsidis Breuning, 1935
- Phloeus Jordan, 1903
- Prosidactus Teocchi et al., 2010
- Pseudidactus Breuning, 1977
- Pseudolatisternum Breuning, 1938
- Pseudoparaphloeus Sama, 2009
- Pseudopezus Breuning, 1969
- Sarathropezus Kolbe, 1893
- Stenophloeus Breuning, 1938
- Trichoeax Breuning, 1938
