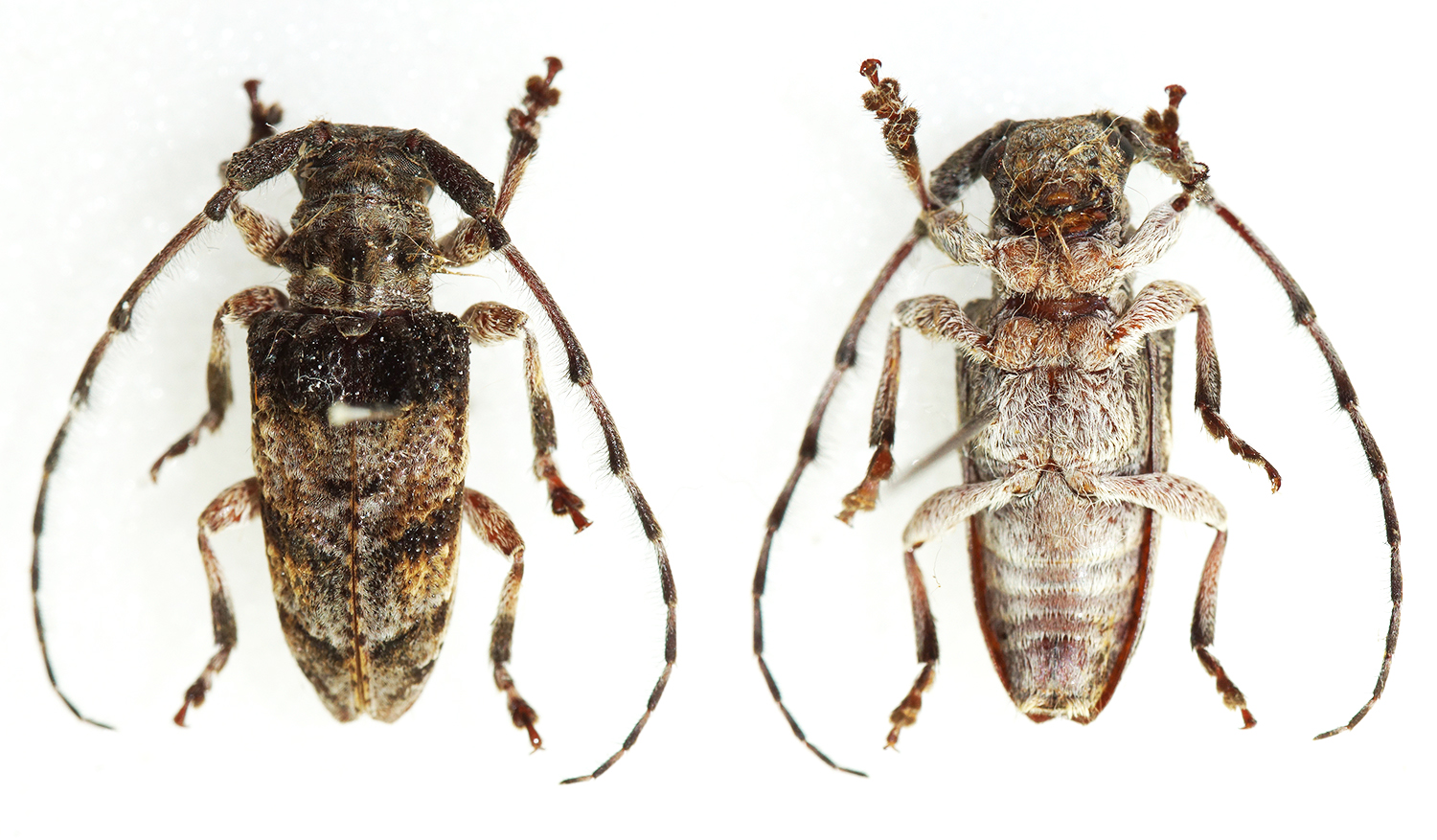
- dactus cristulatus

Scientific classification
- Kingdom: Animalia
- Phylum: Arthropoda
- Class: Insecta
- Order: Coleoptera
- Suborder: Polyphaga
- Infraorder: Cucujiformia
- Family: Cerambycidae
- Genus: Idactus
- Species: I. cristulatus

Binomial name
- Idactus cristulatus (Fairmaire, 1886)

= Idactus cristulatus =

Species of beetle

Idactus cristulatus is a species of beetle in the family Cerambycidae. It was described by Fairmaire in 1886.
