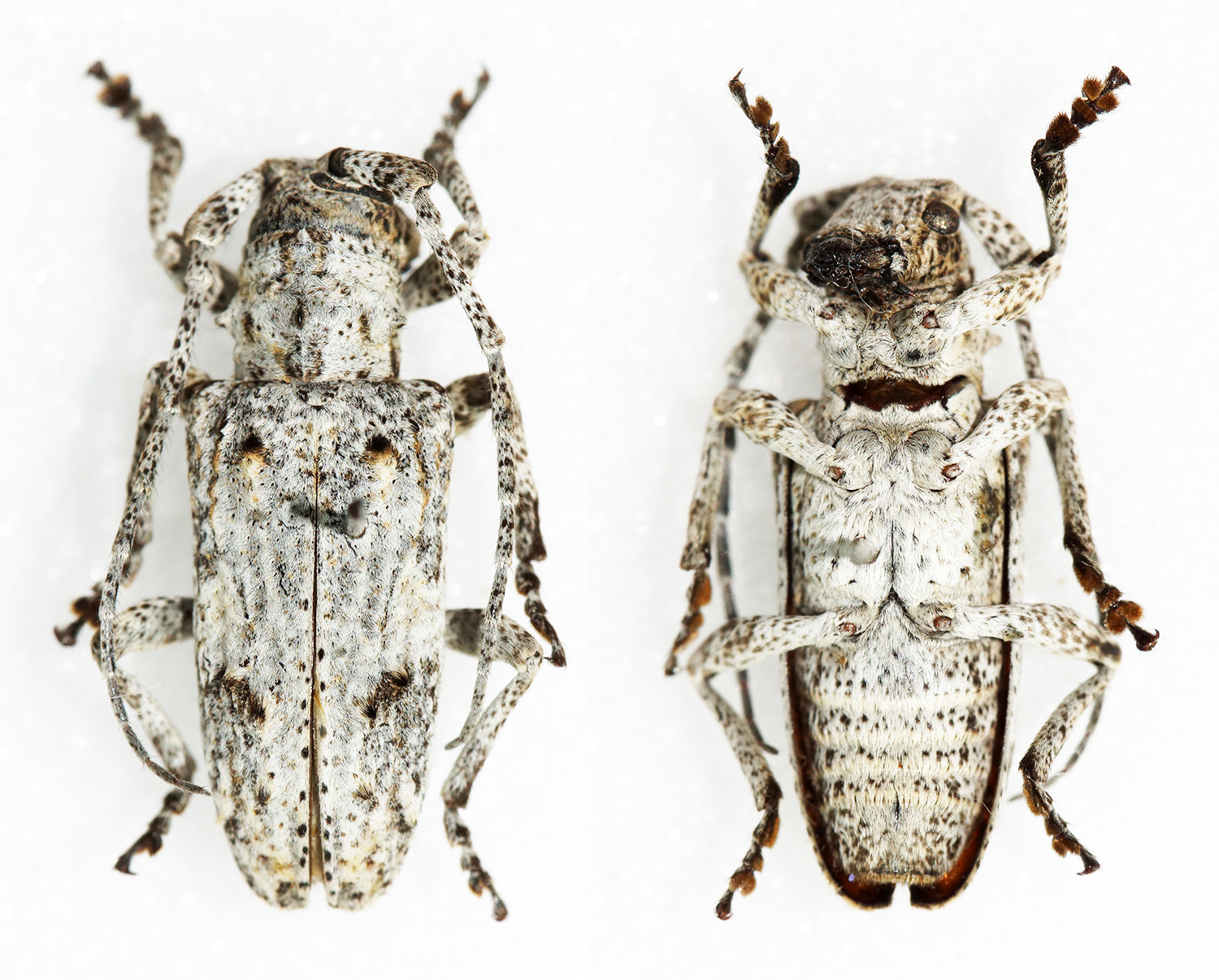

Scientific classification
- Kingdom: Animalia
- Phylum: Arthropoda
- Class: Insecta
- Order: Coleoptera
- Suborder: Polyphaga
- Infraorder: Cucujiformia
- Family: Cerambycidae
- Genus: Idactus
- Species: I. strandi

Binomial name
- Idactus strandi Breuning, 1935

= Idactus strandi =

Species of beetle

Idactus strandi is a species of beetle in the family Cerambycidae. It was described by Breuning in 1935.
