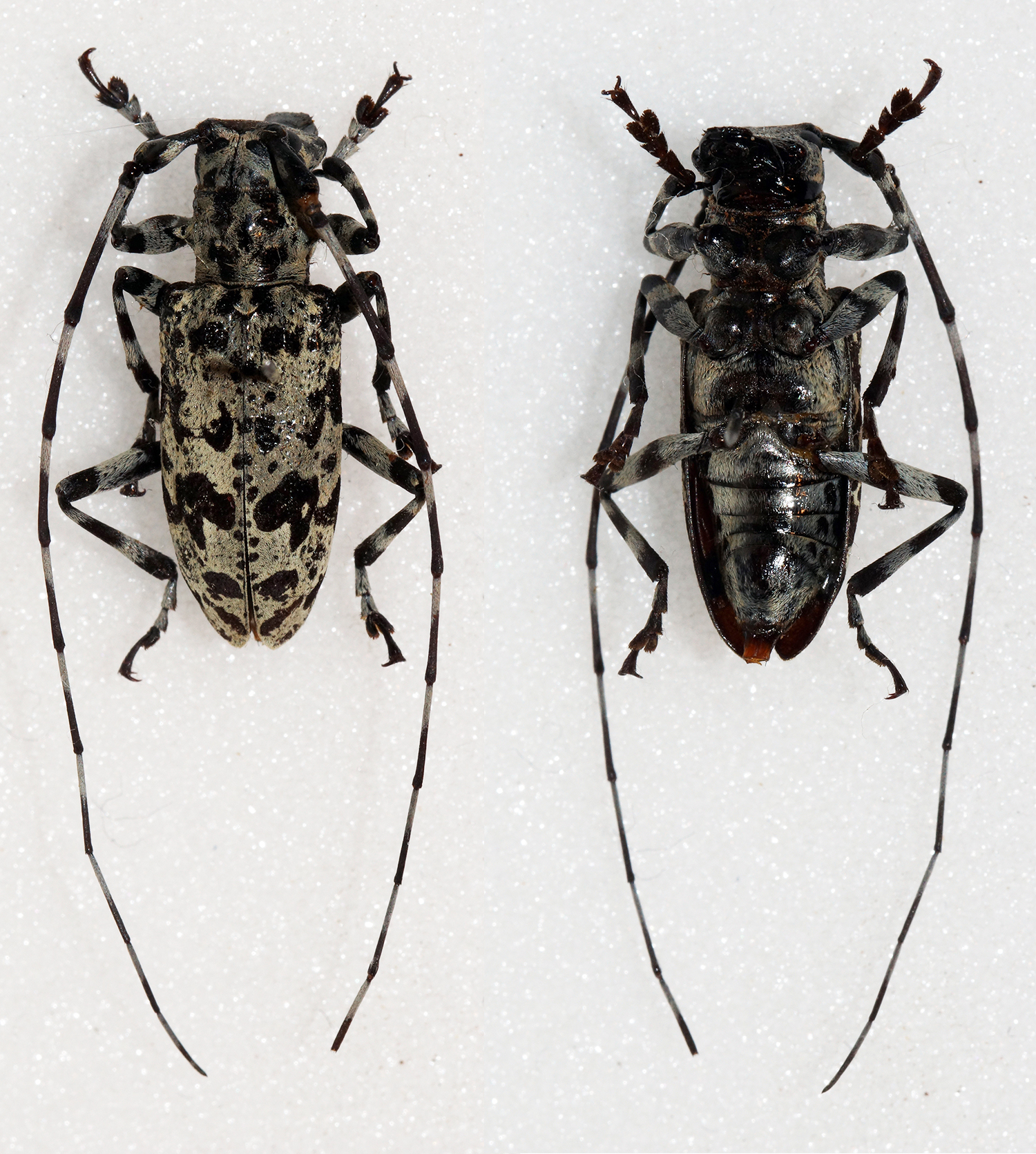

Scientific classification
- Domain: Eukaryota
- Kingdom: Animalia
- Phylum: Arthropoda
- Class: Insecta
- Order: Coleoptera
- Suborder: Polyphaga
- Infraorder: Cucujiformia
- Family: Cerambycidae
- Genus: Palimna
- Species: P. liturata

Binomial name
- Palimna liturata (Bates, 1884)

= Palimna liturata =

Species of beetle

Palimna liturata is a species of beetle in the family Cerambycidae. It was described by Henry Walter Bates in 1884.
