= Parorsidis rondoni =

Scientific classification
- Kingdom: Animalia
- Phylum: Arthropoda
- Class: Insecta
- Order: Coleoptera
- Suborder: Polyphaga
- Infraorder: Cucujiformia
- Family: Cerambycidae
- Genus: Parorsidis
- Species: P. rondoni

Binomial name
- Parorsidis rondoni (Breuning, 1962)

Species of beetle

Parorsidis rondoni is a species of beetle in the family Cerambycidae. It was described by Breuning in 1962.
