= Haploeax =

Scientific classification
- Domain: Eukaryota
- Kingdom: Animalia
- Phylum: Arthropoda
- Class: Insecta
- Order: Coleoptera
- Suborder: Polyphaga
- Infraorder: Cucujiformia
- Family: Cerambycidae
- Tribe: Ancylonotini
- Genus: Haploeax

Genus of beetles

Haploeax is a genus of longhorn beetles of the subfamily Lamiinae.

- Haploeax bimaculatus Breuning, 1977
- Haploeax bituberosa Breuning, 1939
- Haploeax burgeoni Breuning, 1935
- Haploeax cinerea Aurivillius, 1907
- Haploeax latefasciata Breuning, 1952
- Haploeax rohdei Aurivillius, 1907
- Haploeax triangularis (Breuning, 1948)
