= Oeax similis =

Scientific classification
- Kingdom: Animalia
- Phylum: Arthropoda
- Class: Insecta
- Order: Coleoptera
- Suborder: Polyphaga
- Infraorder: Cucujiformia
- Family: Cerambycidae
- Genus: Oeax
- Species: O. similis

Binomial name
- Oeax similis Breuning, 1986

Species of beetle

Oeax similis is a species of beetle in the family Cerambycidae. It was described by Breuning in 1986.
