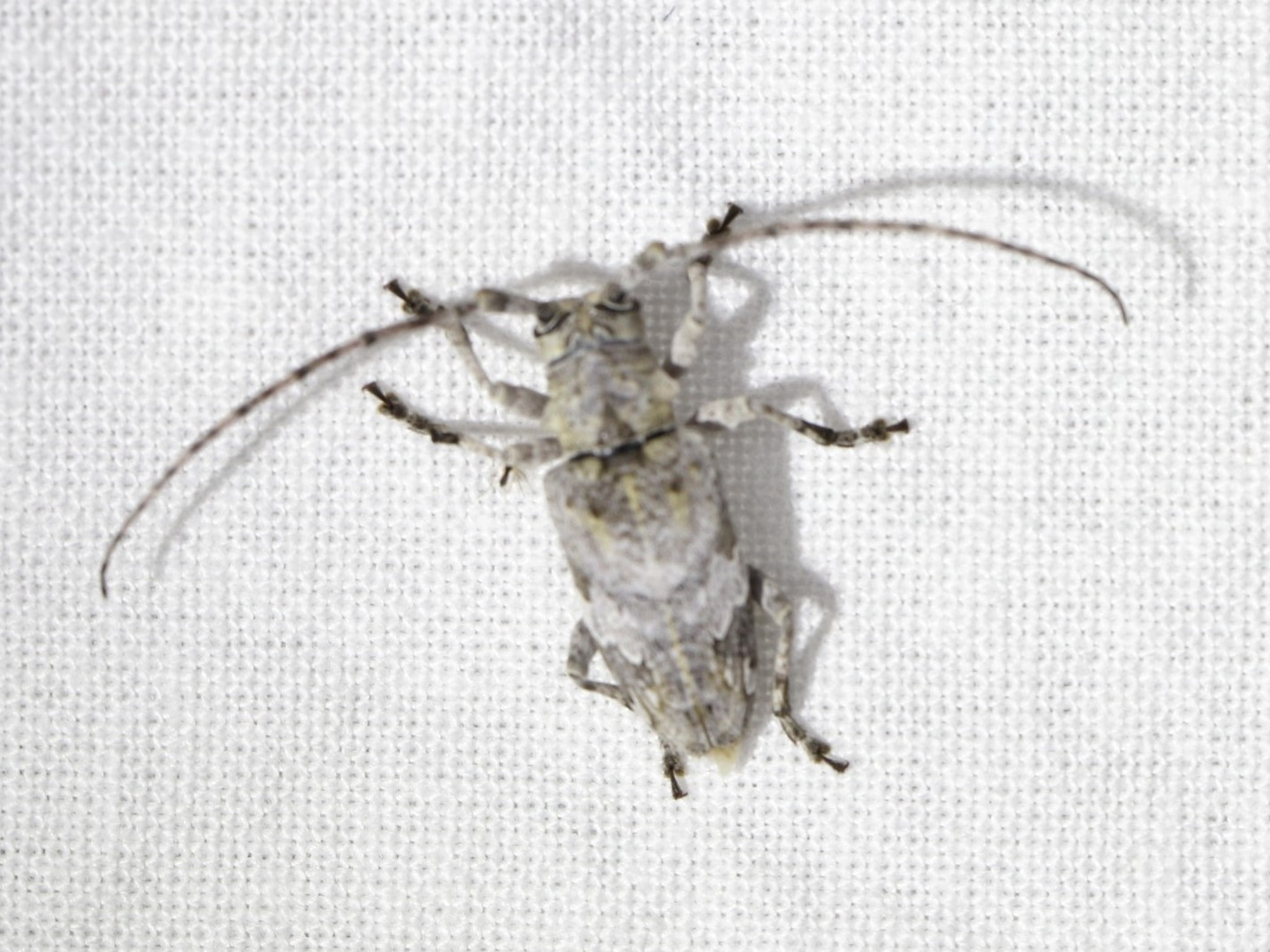

Scientific classification
- Kingdom: Animalia
- Phylum: Arthropoda
- Class: Insecta
- Order: Coleoptera
- Suborder: Polyphaga
- Infraorder: Cucujiformia
- Family: Cerambycidae
- Genus: Idactus
- Species: I. iranicus

Binomial name
- Idactus iranicus Breuning, 1975

= Idactus iranicus =

Species of beetle

Idactus iranicus is a species of beetle in the family Cerambycidae. It was first described by Breuning in 1975.
