= Palimna fukiena =

Scientific classification
- Domain: Eukaryota
- Kingdom: Animalia
- Phylum: Arthropoda
- Class: Insecta
- Order: Coleoptera
- Suborder: Polyphaga
- Infraorder: Cucujiformia
- Family: Cerambycidae
- Genus: Palimna
- Species: P. fukiena

Binomial name
- Palimna fukiena Gressitt, 1951

Species of beetle

Palimna fukiena is a species of beetle in the family Cerambycidae. It was described by Gressitt in 1951.
