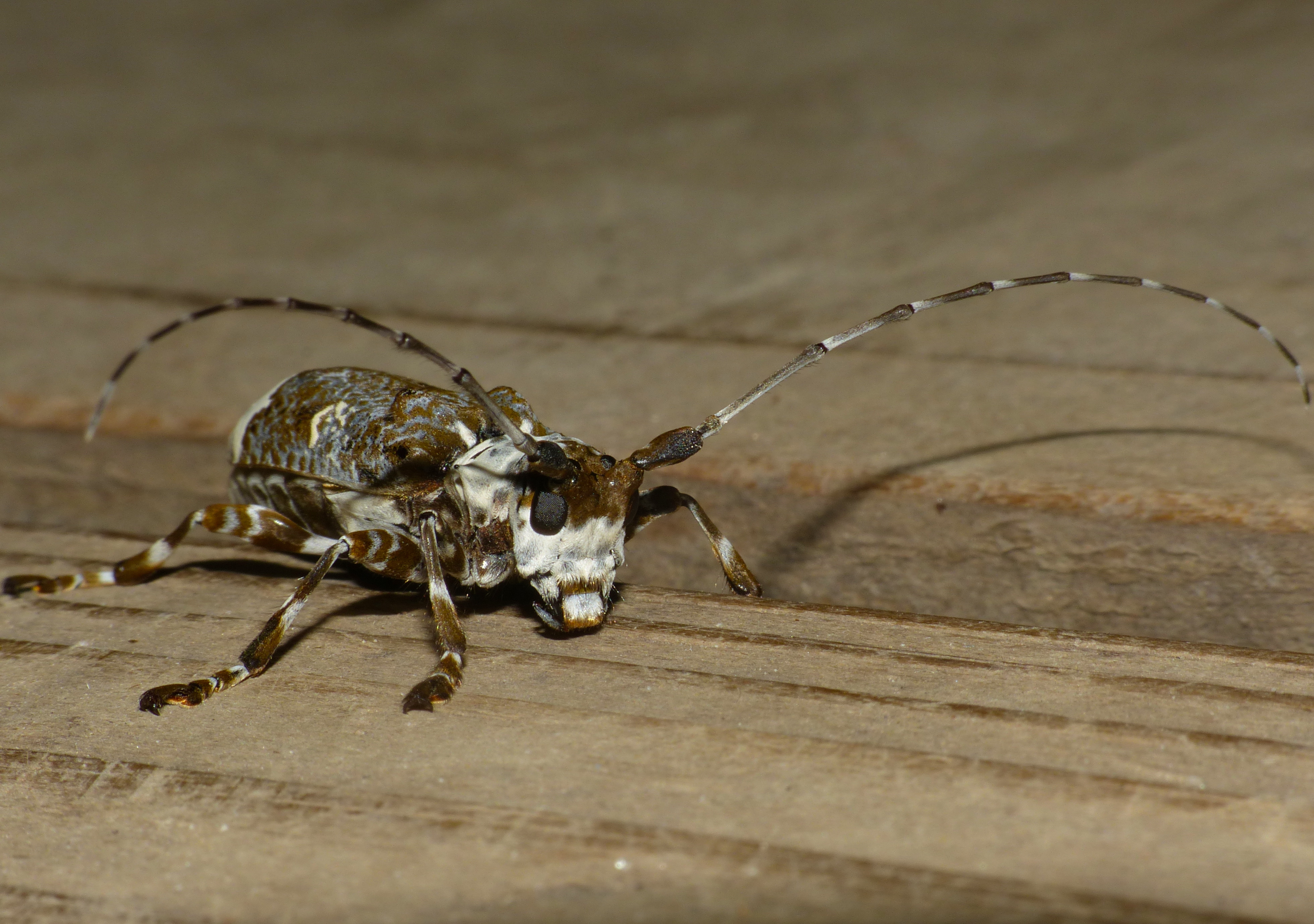

Scientific classification
- Kingdom: Animalia
- Phylum: Arthropoda
- Class: Insecta
- Order: Coleoptera
- Suborder: Polyphaga
- Infraorder: Cucujiformia
- Family: Cerambycidae
- Genus: Lasiopezus
- Species: L. longimanus

Binomial name
- Lasiopezus longimanus (Thomson, 1864)

= Lasiopezus longimanus =

Species of beetle

Lasiopezus longimanus is a species of beetle in the family Cerambycidae. It was described by Thomson in 1864.
