= Paridactus idactiformis =

Scientific classification
- Kingdom: Animalia
- Phylum: Arthropoda
- Class: Insecta
- Order: Coleoptera
- Suborder: Polyphaga
- Infraorder: Cucujiformia
- Family: Cerambycidae
- Genus: Paridactus
- Species: P. idactiformis

Binomial name
- Paridactus idactiformis Breuning, 1964

Species of beetle

Paridactus idactiformis is a species of beetle in the family Cerambycidae. It was described by Breuning in 1964.
