= Latisternum romani =

Scientific classification
- Kingdom: Animalia
- Phylum: Arthropoda
- Class: Insecta
- Order: Coleoptera
- Suborder: Polyphaga
- Infraorder: Cucujiformia
- Family: Cerambycidae
- Genus: Latisternum
- Species: L. romani

Binomial name
- Latisternum romani Breuning, 1935

Species of beetle

Latisternum romani is a species of beetle in the family Cerambycidae. It was described by Breuning in 1935.
