= Idactus coquereli =

Scientific classification
- Kingdom: Animalia
- Phylum: Arthropoda
- Class: Insecta
- Order: Coleoptera
- Suborder: Polyphaga
- Infraorder: Cucujiformia
- Family: Cerambycidae
- Genus: Idactus
- Species: I. coquereli

Binomial name
- Idactus coquereli (Fairmaire, 1890)

Species of beetle

Idactus coquereli is a species of beetle in the family Cerambycidae. It was described by Fairmaire in 1890.
