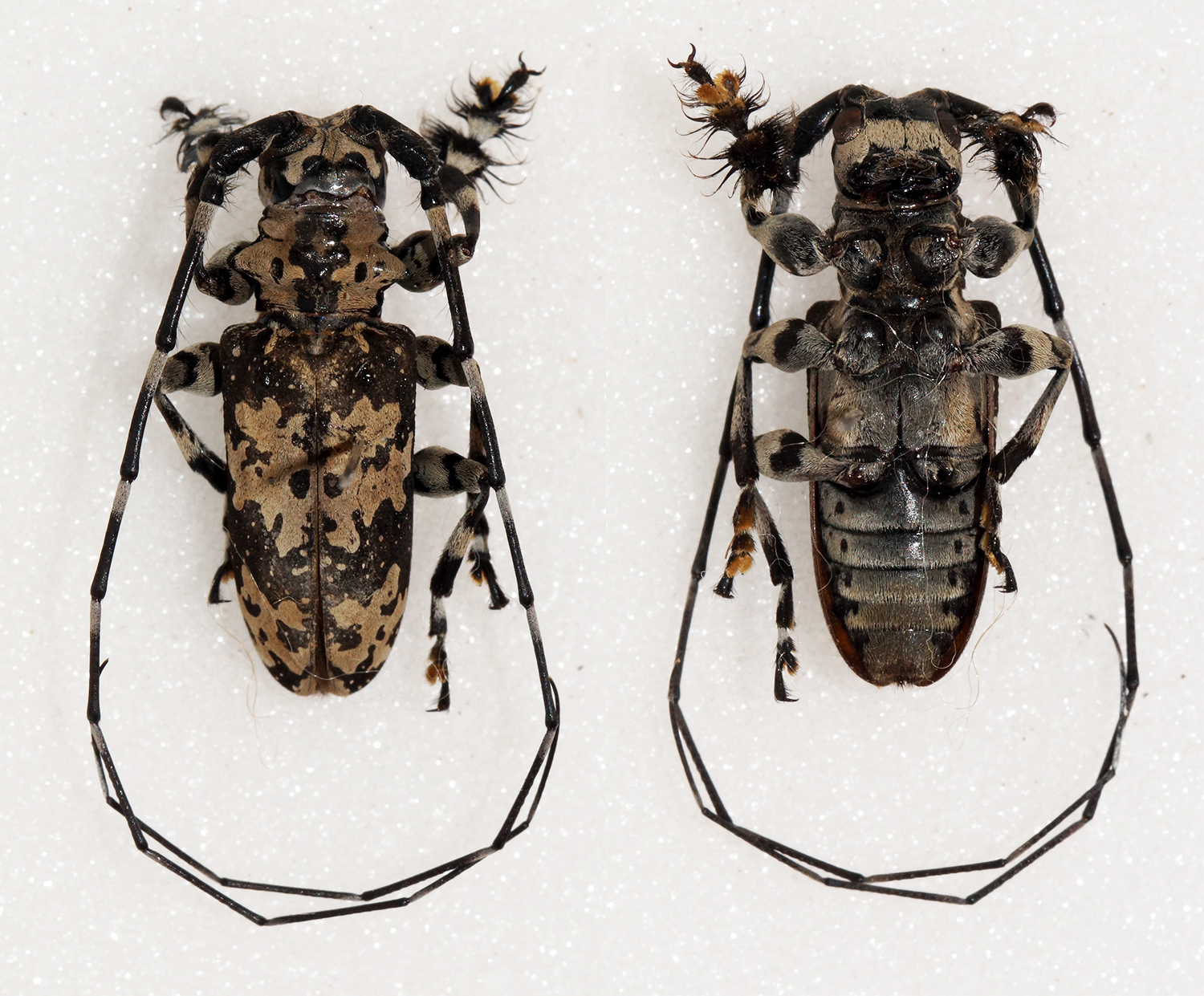

Scientific classification
- Kingdom: Animalia
- Phylum: Arthropoda
- Class: Insecta
- Order: Coleoptera
- Suborder: Polyphaga
- Infraorder: Cucujiformia
- Family: Cerambycidae
- Genus: Lasiopezus
- Species: L. nigromaculatus

Binomial name
- Lasiopezus nigromaculatus Quedenfeldt, 1882

= Lasiopezus nigromaculatus =

Species of beetle

Lasiopezus nigromaculatus is an African species of Longhorn beetle in the family Cerambycidae, and found south of the Equator. It was described by Quedenfeldt in 1882.
