= Palimna palimnoides =

Scientific classification
- Domain: Eukaryota
- Kingdom: Animalia
- Phylum: Arthropoda
- Class: Insecta
- Order: Coleoptera
- Suborder: Polyphaga
- Infraorder: Cucujiformia
- Family: Cerambycidae
- Genus: Palimna
- Species: P. palimnoides

Binomial name
- Palimna palimnoides (Schwarzer, 1925)

Species of beetle

Palimna palimnoides is a species of beetle in the family Cerambycidae. It was described by Schwarzer in 1925.
