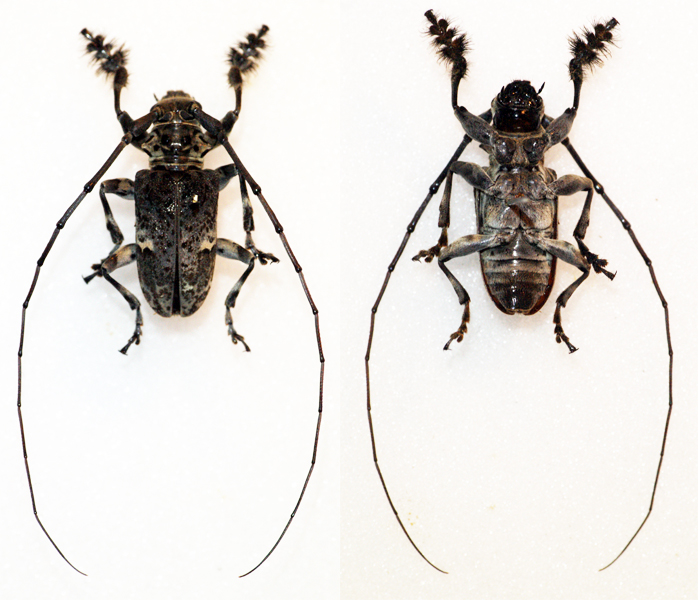

Scientific classification
- Kingdom: Animalia
- Phylum: Arthropoda
- Clade: Pancrustacea
- Class: Insecta
- Order: Coleoptera
- Suborder: Polyphaga
- Infraorder: Cucujiformia
- Family: Cerambycidae
- Genus: Lasiopezus
- Species: L. variegator

Binomial name
- Lasiopezus variegator (Fabricius, 1781)

= Lasiopezus variegator =

Species of beetle

Lasiopezus variegator is a species of beetle in the family Cerambycidae. It was described by Johan Christian Fabricius in 1781.
