= Phloeus ruber =

Scientific classification
- Kingdom: Animalia
- Phylum: Arthropoda
- Class: Insecta
- Order: Coleoptera
- Suborder: Polyphaga
- Infraorder: Cucujiformia
- Family: Cerambycidae
- Genus: Phloeus
- Species: P. ruber

Binomial name
- Phloeus ruber Breuning, 1981

Species of beetle

Phloeus ruber is a species of beetle in the family Cerambycidae. It was described by Breuning in 1981.
