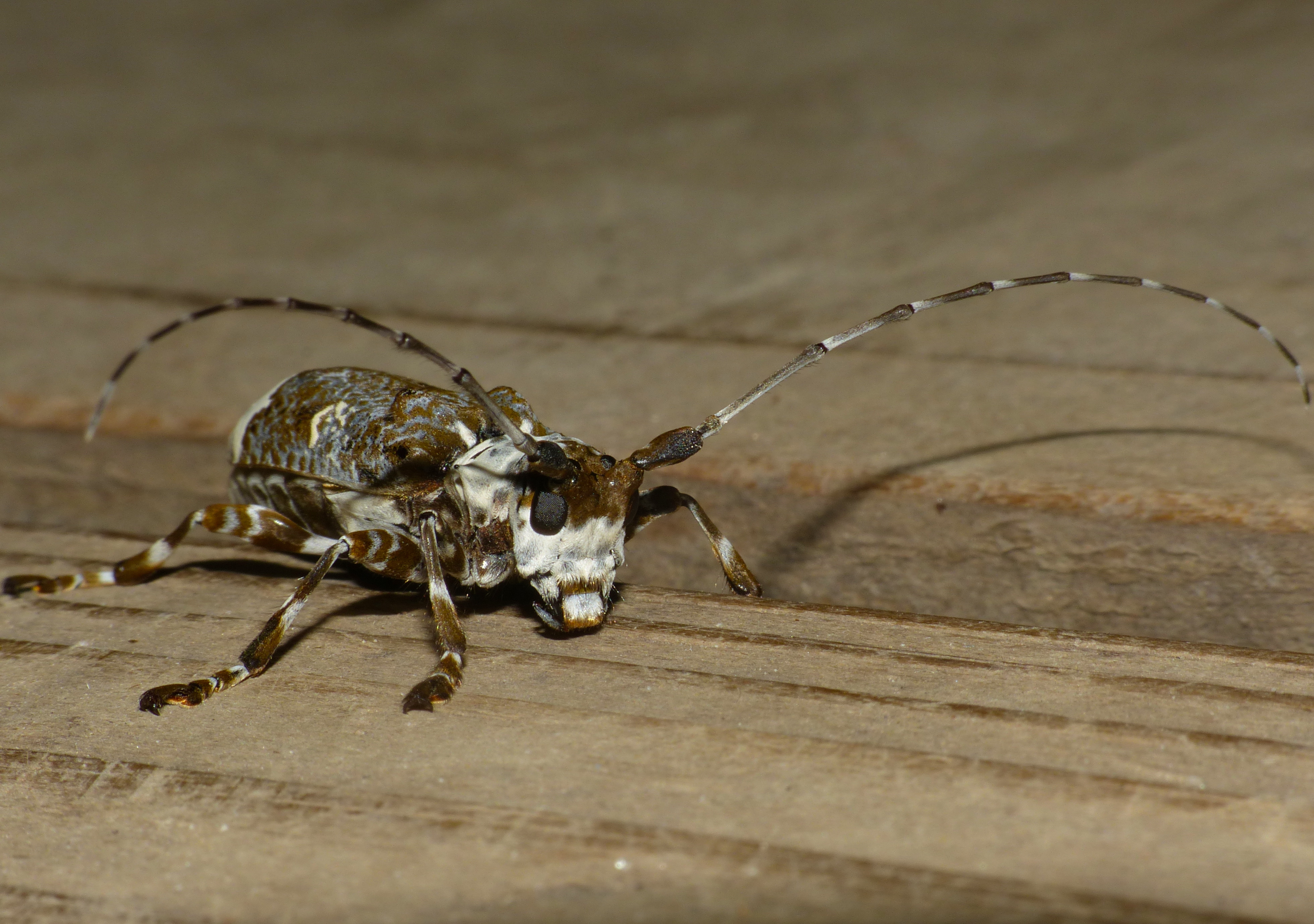
- Lasiopezus longimanus

Scientific classification
- Kingdom: Animalia
- Phylum: Arthropoda
- Class: Insecta
- Order: Coleoptera
- Suborder: Polyphaga
- Infraorder: Cucujiformia
- Family: Cerambycidae
- Subfamily: Lamiinae
- Tribe: Ancylonotini
- Genus: Lasiopezus; Pascoe, 1859

= Lasiopezus =

Genus of beetles

Lasiopezus is a genus of longhorn beetles of the subfamily Lamiinae.

- Lasiopezus affinis Breuning, 1977
- Lasiopezus brunoi Breuning, 1972
- Lasiopezus hiekei (Breuning, 1968) inq.
- Lasiopezus latefasciatus Breuning, 1938
- Lasiopezus longimanus (Thomson, 1864)
- Lasiopezus marmoratus (Olivier, 1795)
- Lasiopezus nigromaculatus Quedenfeldt, 1882
- Lasiopezus sordidus (Olivier, 1795)
- Lasiopezus variegator (Fabricius, 1781)
