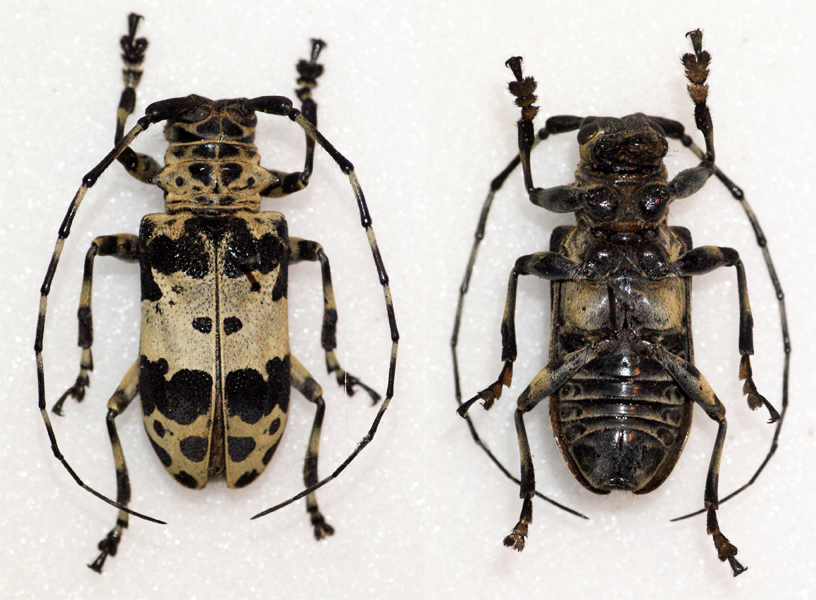

Scientific classification
- Kingdom: Animalia
- Phylum: Arthropoda
- Clade: Pancrustacea
- Class: Insecta
- Order: Coleoptera
- Suborder: Polyphaga
- Infraorder: Cucujiformia
- Family: Cerambycidae
- Genus: Lasiopezus
- Species: L. sordidus

Binomial name
- Lasiopezus sordidus (Olivier, 1795)

= Lasiopezus sordidus =

Species of beetle

Lasiopezus sordidus is a species of beetle in the family Cerambycidae. It was described by Olivier in 1795.
