= Parorsidis =

Scientific classification
- Kingdom: Animalia
- Phylum: Arthropoda
- Class: Insecta
- Order: Coleoptera
- Suborder: Polyphaga
- Infraorder: Cucujiformia
- Family: Cerambycidae
- Subfamily: Lamiinae
- Tribe: Ancylonotini
- Genus: Parorsidis; Breuning, 1935

Genus of beetles

Parorsidis is a genus of longhorn beetles of the subfamily Lamiinae.

- Parorsidis ceylanica Breuning, 1982
- Parorsidis delevauxi Breuning, 1962
- Parorsidis nigrosparsa (Pic, 1929)
- Parorsidis rondoni (Breuning, 1962)
- Parorsidis transversevittata Breuning, 1963
