= Oeax griseus =

Scientific classification
- Kingdom: Animalia
- Phylum: Arthropoda
- Class: Insecta
- Order: Coleoptera
- Suborder: Polyphaga
- Infraorder: Cucujiformia
- Family: Cerambycidae
- Genus: Oeax
- Species: O. griseus

Binomial name
- Oeax griseus Breuning, 1951

Species of beetle

Oeax griseus is a species of beetle in the family Cerambycidae. It was described by Breuning in 1951.
