= Oeax tricuspis =

Scientific classification
- Domain: Eukaryota
- Kingdom: Animalia
- Phylum: Arthropoda
- Class: Insecta
- Order: Coleoptera
- Suborder: Polyphaga
- Infraorder: Cucujiformia
- Family: Cerambycidae
- Genus: Oeax
- Species: O. tricuspis

Binomial name
- Oeax tricuspis Báguena, 1952

Species of beetle

Oeax tricuspis is a species of beetle in the family Cerambycidae. It was described by Báguena in 1952.
