= Parorsidis nigrosparsa =

Scientific classification
- Kingdom: Animalia
- Phylum: Arthropoda
- Clade: Pancrustacea
- Class: Insecta
- Order: Coleoptera
- Suborder: Polyphaga
- Infraorder: Cucujiformia
- Family: Cerambycidae
- Genus: Parorsidis
- Species: P. nigrosparsa

Binomial name
- Parorsidis nigrosparsa (Pic, 1929)

Species of beetle

Parorsidis nigrosparsa is a species of beetle in the family Cerambycidae. It was described by Pic in 1929.
