= Phloeus =

Scientific classification
- Kingdom: Animalia
- Phylum: Arthropoda
- Class: Insecta
- Order: Coleoptera
- Suborder: Polyphaga
- Infraorder: Cucujiformia
- Family: Cerambycidae
- Tribe: Ancylonotini
- Genus: Phloeus

Genus of beetles

Phloeus is a genus of longhorn beetles of the subfamily Lamiinae.

- Phloeus brevis Jordan, 1903
- Phloeus ruber Breuning, 1981
