= Falsidactus vittatus =

Scientific classification
- Kingdom: Animalia
- Phylum: Arthropoda
- Class: Insecta
- Order: Coleoptera
- Suborder: Polyphaga
- Infraorder: Cucujiformia
- Family: Cerambycidae
- Genus: Falsidactus
- Species: F. vittatus

Binomial name
- Falsidactus vittatus (Hintz, 1910)

Species of beetle

Falsidactus vittatus is a species of beetle in the family Cerambycidae. It was described by Hintz in 1910.
