= Oeax triangularis =

Scientific classification
- Domain: Eukaryota
- Kingdom: Animalia
- Phylum: Arthropoda
- Class: Insecta
- Order: Coleoptera
- Suborder: Polyphaga
- Infraorder: Cucujiformia
- Family: Cerambycidae
- Genus: Oeax
- Species: O. triangularis

Binomial name
- Oeax triangularis (White, 1858)

Species of beetle

Oeax triangularis is a species of beetle in the family Cerambycidae. It was described by White in 1858.
