= Oeax marshalli =

Scientific classification
- Kingdom: Animalia
- Phylum: Arthropoda
- Class: Insecta
- Order: Coleoptera
- Suborder: Polyphaga
- Infraorder: Cucujiformia
- Family: Cerambycidae
- Genus: Oeax
- Species: O. marshalli

Binomial name
- Oeax marshalli Breuning, 1935

Species of beetle

Oeax marshalli is a species of beetle in the family Cerambycidae. It was described by Breuning in 1935.
