= Idactus exiguus =

Scientific classification
- Domain: Eukaryota
- Kingdom: Animalia
- Phylum: Arthropoda
- Class: Insecta
- Order: Coleoptera
- Suborder: Polyphaga
- Infraorder: Cucujiformia
- Family: Cerambycidae
- Genus: Idactus
- Species: I. exiguus

Binomial name
- Idactus exiguus (Quedenfeldt, 1891)

Species of beetle

Idactus exiguus is a species of beetle of the family Cerambycidae. It was described by Quedenfeldt in 1891.
