= Paridactus tarsalis =

Scientific classification
- Kingdom: Animalia
- Phylum: Arthropoda
- Class: Insecta
- Order: Coleoptera
- Suborder: Polyphaga
- Infraorder: Cucujiformia
- Family: Cerambycidae
- Genus: Paridactus
- Species: P. tarsalis

Binomial name
- Paridactus tarsalis Gahan, 1898

Species of beetle

Paridactus tarsalis is a species of beetle in the family Cerambycidae. It was described by Gahan in 1898.
