= Idactus spinipennis =

Scientific classification
- Domain: Eukaryota
- Kingdom: Animalia
- Phylum: Arthropoda
- Class: Insecta
- Order: Coleoptera
- Suborder: Polyphaga
- Infraorder: Cucujiformia
- Family: Cerambycidae
- Genus: Idactus
- Species: I. spinipennis

Binomial name
- Idactus spinipennis Gahan, 1890

Species of beetle

Idactus spinipennis is a species of beetle in the family Cerambycidae. It was described by Gahan in 1890.
