= Idactus hieroglyphicus =

Scientific classification
- Domain: Eukaryota
- Kingdom: Animalia
- Phylum: Arthropoda
- Class: Insecta
- Order: Coleoptera
- Suborder: Polyphaga
- Infraorder: Cucujiformia
- Family: Cerambycidae
- Genus: Idactus
- Species: I. hieroglyphicus

Binomial name
- Idactus hieroglyphicus (Taschenberg, 1883)

Species of beetle

Idactus hieroglyphicus is a species of beetle in the family Cerambycidae. It was described by Taschenberg in 1883.
