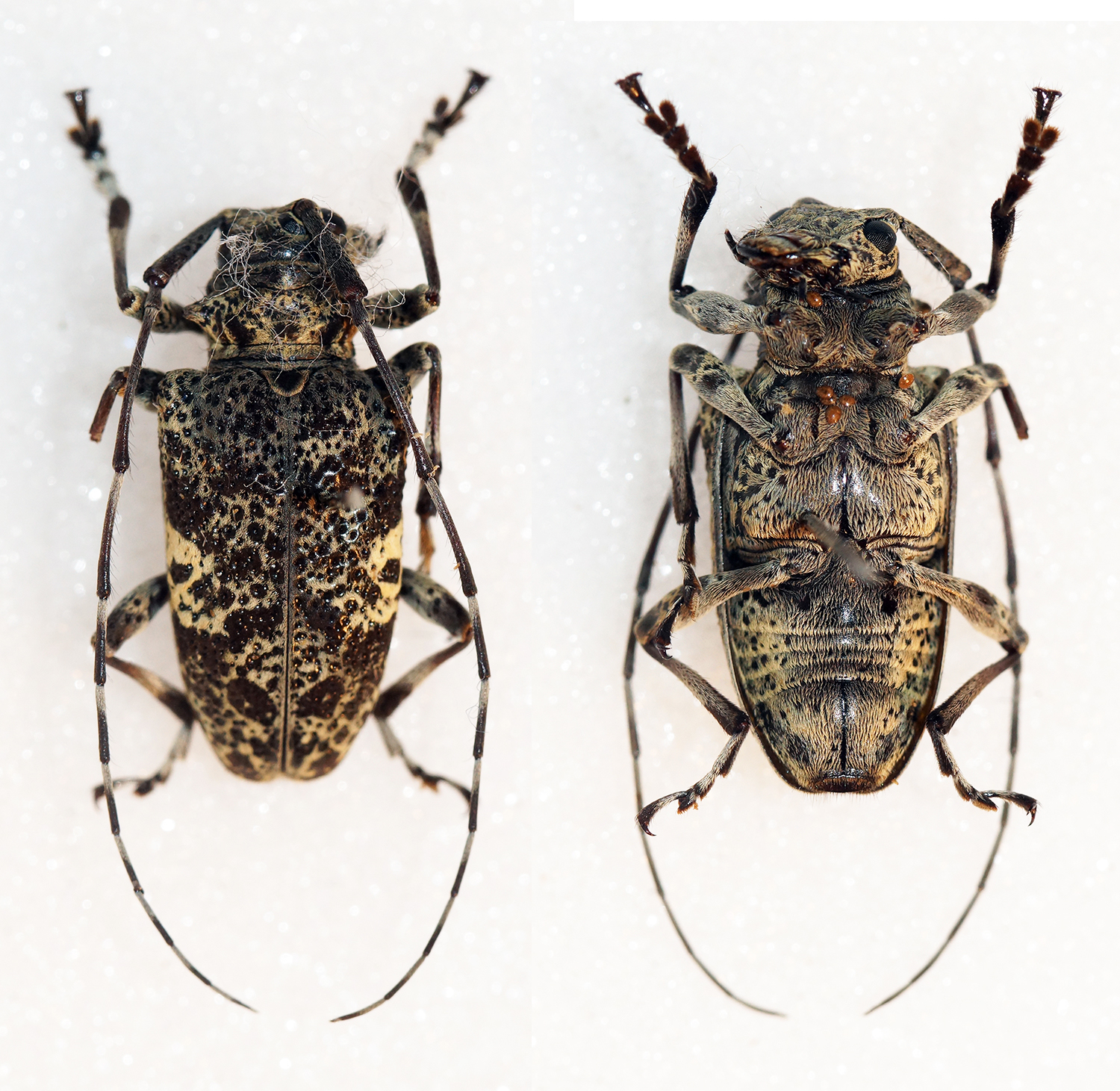
- Latisternum strandi

Scientific classification
- Kingdom: Animalia
- Phylum: Arthropoda
- Class: Insecta
- Order: Coleoptera
- Suborder: Polyphaga
- Infraorder: Cucujiformia
- Family: Cerambycidae
- Subfamily: Lamiinae
- Tribe: Ancylonotini
- Genus: Latisternum; Jordan, 1894

= Latisternum =

Genus of beetles

Latisternum is a genus of longhorn beetles of the subfamily Lamiinae.

- Latisternum burgeoni Breuning, 1935
- Latisternum macropus Jordan, 1903
- Latisternum marshalli Breuning, 1935
- Latisternum pulchrum Jordan, 1894
- Latisternum romani Breuning, 1935
- Latisternum simile Báguena & Breuning, 1958
- Latisternum strandi Breuning, 1935
