= Paroeax nasicornis =

Scientific classification
- Kingdom: Animalia
- Phylum: Arthropoda
- Class: Insecta
- Order: Coleoptera
- Suborder: Polyphaga
- Infraorder: Cucujiformia
- Family: Cerambycidae
- Genus: Paroeax
- Species: P. nasicornis

Binomial name
- Paroeax nasicornis (Pascoe, 1871)

Species of beetle

Paroeax nasicornis is a species of beetle in the family Cerambycidae. It was described by Pascoe in 1871.
