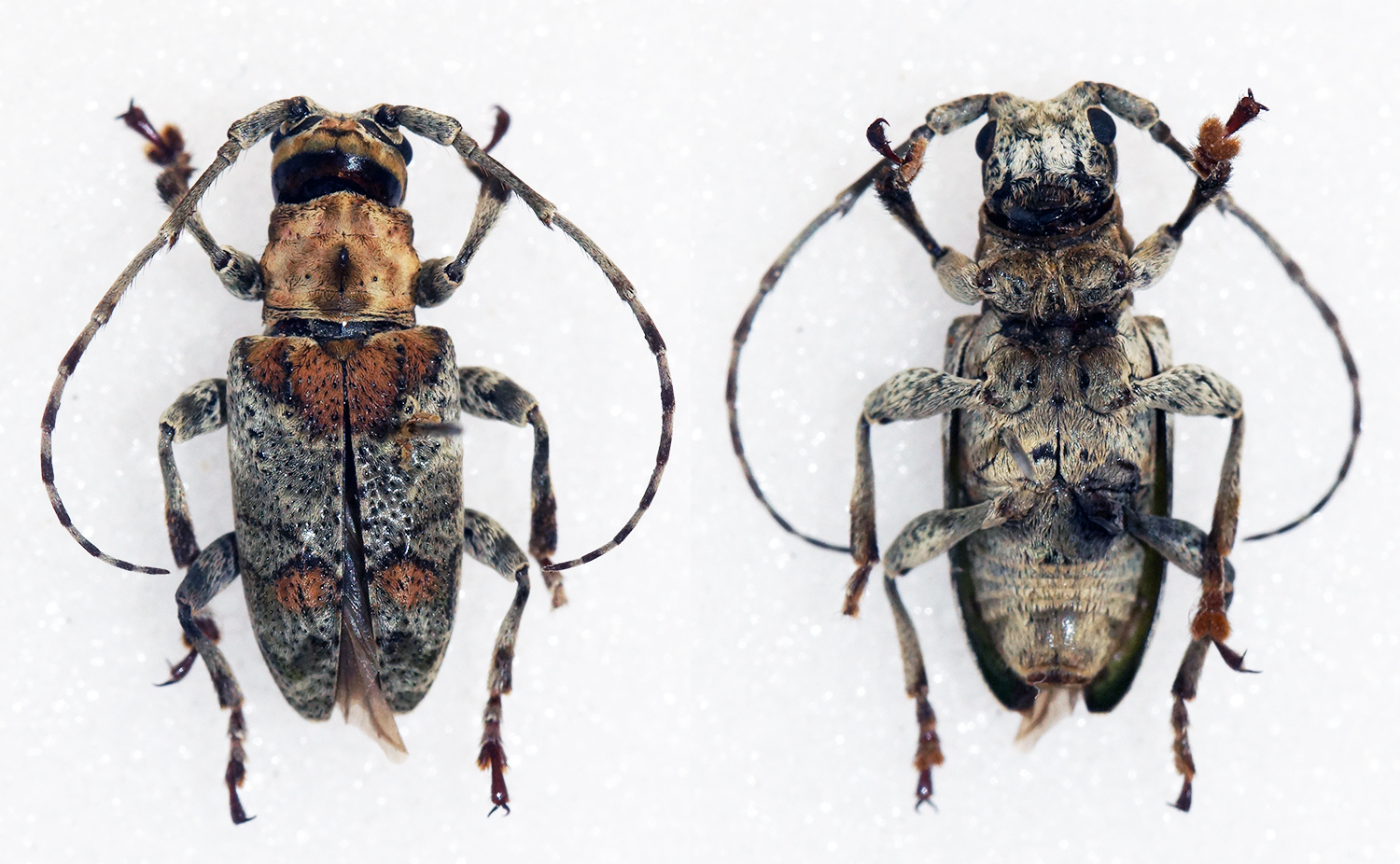

Scientific classification
- Domain: Eukaryota
- Kingdom: Animalia
- Phylum: Arthropoda
- Class: Insecta
- Order: Coleoptera
- Suborder: Polyphaga
- Infraorder: Cucujiformia
- Family: Cerambycidae
- Genus: Oeax
- Species: O. collaris

Binomial name
- Oeax collaris Jordan, 1903

= Oeax collaris =

Species of beetle

Oeax collaris is a species of beetle in the family Cerambycidae. It was described by Karl Jordan in 1903.
