= Paroeax schoutedeni =

Scientific classification
- Kingdom: Animalia
- Phylum: Arthropoda
- Class: Insecta
- Order: Coleoptera
- Suborder: Polyphaga
- Infraorder: Cucujiformia
- Family: Cerambycidae
- Genus: Paroeax
- Species: P. schoutedeni

Binomial name
- Paroeax schoutedeni Breuning, 1935

Species of beetle

Paroeax schoutedeni is a species of beetle in the family Cerambycidae. It was described by Breuning in 1935.
