= Idactus verdieri =

Scientific classification
- Kingdom: Animalia
- Phylum: Arthropoda
- Class: Insecta
- Order: Coleoptera
- Suborder: Polyphaga
- Infraorder: Cucujiformia
- Family: Cerambycidae
- Genus: Idactus
- Species: I. verdieri

Binomial name
- Idactus verdieri Lepesme & Breuning, 1956

Species of beetle

Idactus verdieri is a species of beetle in the family Cerambycidae. It was described by Lepesme and Breuning in 1956.
