= Palimna infausta =

Scientific classification
- Domain: Eukaryota
- Kingdom: Animalia
- Phylum: Arthropoda
- Class: Insecta
- Order: Coleoptera
- Suborder: Polyphaga
- Infraorder: Cucujiformia
- Family: Cerambycidae
- Genus: Palimna
- Species: P. infausta

Binomial name
- Palimna infausta (Pascoe, 1859)

Species of beetle

Palimna infausta is a species of beetle in the family Cerambycidae. It was described by Pascoe in 1859.
