= Oeax lichenea =

Scientific classification
- Domain: Eukaryota
- Kingdom: Animalia
- Phylum: Arthropoda
- Class: Insecta
- Order: Coleoptera
- Suborder: Polyphaga
- Infraorder: Cucujiformia
- Family: Cerambycidae
- Genus: Oeax
- Species: O. lichenea

Binomial name
- Oeax lichenea Duvivier, 1891

Species of beetle

Oeax lichenea is a species of beetle in the family Cerambycidae. It was described by Duvivier in 1891.
