= Dorcoeax jadoti =

Scientific classification
- Kingdom: Animalia
- Phylum: Arthropoda
- Class: Insecta
- Order: Coleoptera
- Suborder: Polyphaga
- Infraorder: Cucujiformia
- Family: Cerambycidae
- Genus: Dorcoeax
- Species: D. jadoti

Binomial name
- Dorcoeax jadoti Téocchi, 2001

Species of beetle

Dorcoeax jadoti is a species of beetle in the family Cerambycidae. It was described by Téocchi in 2001.
