= Lasiopezus affinis =

Scientific classification
- Kingdom: Animalia
- Phylum: Arthropoda
- Class: Insecta
- Order: Coleoptera
- Suborder: Polyphaga
- Infraorder: Cucujiformia
- Family: Cerambycidae
- Genus: Lasiopezus
- Species: L. affinis

Binomial name
- Lasiopezus affinis Breuning, 1977

Species of beetle

Lasiopezus affinis is a species of beetle in the family Cerambycidae. It was described by Breuning in 1977.
