= Palimna =

Scientific classification
- Domain: Eukaryota
- Kingdom: Animalia
- Phylum: Arthropoda
- Class: Insecta
- Order: Coleoptera
- Suborder: Polyphaga
- Infraorder: Cucujiformia
- Family: Cerambycidae
- Tribe: Ancylonotini
- Genus: Palimna

Genus of beetles

Palimna is a genus of longhorn beetles of the subfamily Lamiinae.

- Palimna alorensis Breuning, 1956
- Palimna andamanica Breuning, 1935
- Palimna annulata (Olivier, 1792)
- Palimna formosana (Kano, 1933)
- Palimna fukiena Gressitt, 1951
- Palimna indica Breuning, 1938
- Palimna indosinica Breuning, 1938
- Palimna infausta (Pascoe, 1859)
- Palimna liturata (Bates, 1884)
- Palimna palimnoides (Schwarzer, 1925)
- Palimna persimilis Breuning, 1938
- Palimna rondoni Breuning, 1963
- Palimna subrondoni Breuning, 1964
- Palimna sumatrana Breuning, 1938
- Palimna yunnana Breuning, 1935
