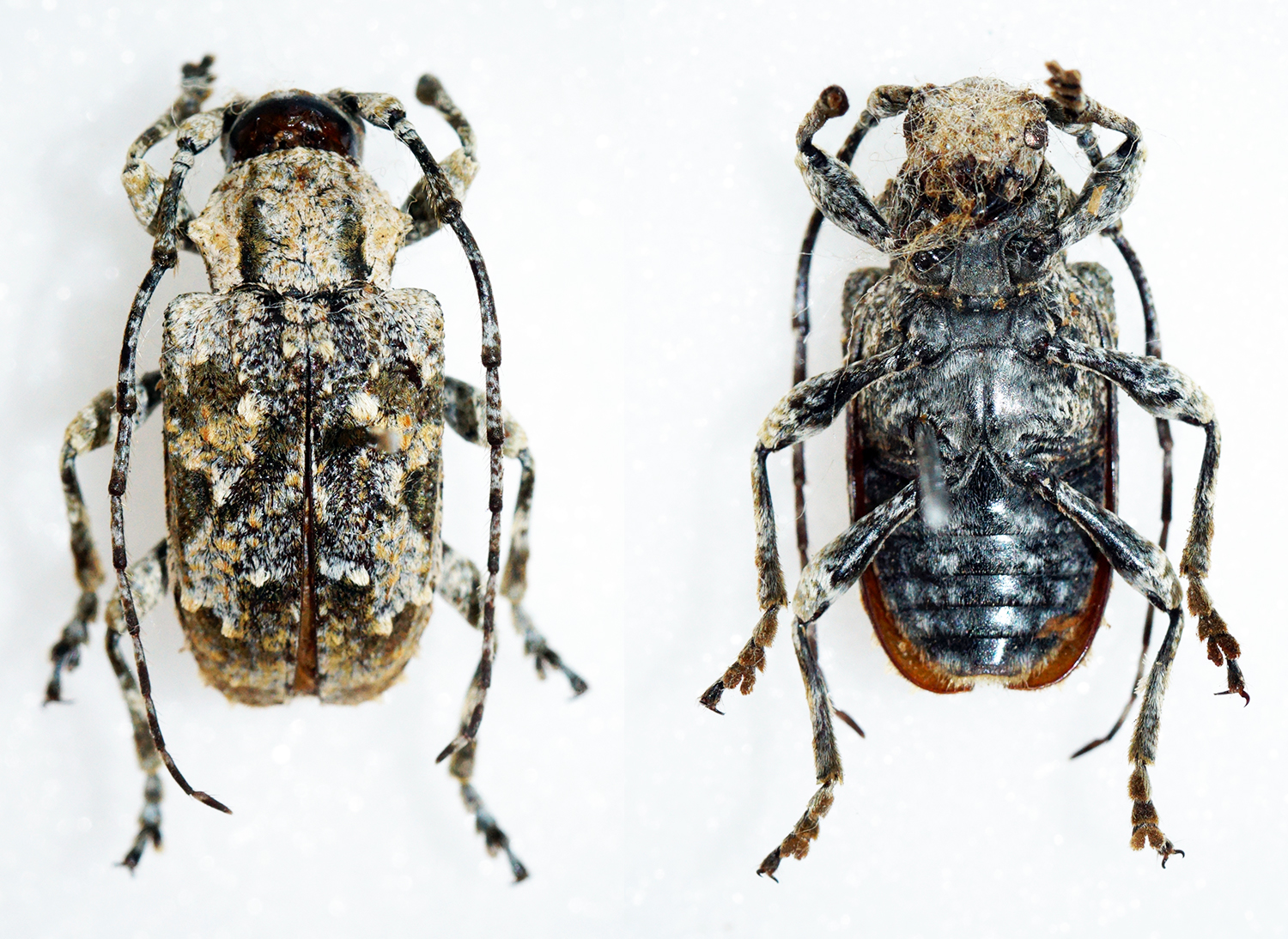
- Idactus ellioti

Scientific classification
- Domain: Eukaryota
- Kingdom: Animalia
- Phylum: Arthropoda
- Class: Insecta
- Order: Coleoptera
- Suborder: Polyphaga
- Infraorder: Cucujiformia
- Family: Cerambycidae
- Subfamily: Lamiinae
- Tribe: Ancylonotini
- Genus: Idactus; Pascoe, 1864

= Idactus =

Genus of beetles

Idactus is a genus of longhorn beetles of the subfamily Lamiinae.

- Idactus ashanticus Breuning, 1960
- Idactus bettoni Gahan, 1898
- Idactus blairi Breuning, 1935
- Idactus browni Breuning, 1981
- Idactus burgeoni Breuning, 1935
- Idactus coquereli (Fairmaire, 1890)
- Idactus cristulatus (Fairmaire, 1886)
- Idactus damarensis Breuning, 1938
- Idactus ellioti Gahan, 1890
- Idactus exiguus (Quedenfeldt, 1891)
- Idactus flavovittatus Teocchi, 1986
- Idactus fuscovittatus Breuning, 1971
- Idactus hieroglyphicus (Taschenberg, 1883)
- Idactus iranicus Breuning, 1975
- Idactus konso Quentin & Villiers, 1981
- Idactus lateralis Gahan, 1898
- Idactus maculicornis Gahan, 1890
- Idactus minimus Teocchi & Sudre, 2002
- Idactus multifasciculatus Breuning, 1938
- Idactus nigroplagiatus Breuning, 1935
- Idactus paramaculicornis Breuning, 1973
- Idactus rusticus Aurivillius, 1916
- Idactus spinipennis Gahan, 1890
- Idactus strandi Breuning, 1935
- Idactus tridens Pascoe, 1864
- Idactus tuberculatus Quedenfeldt, 1885
- Idactus usambaricus Hintz, 1910
- Idactus verdieri Lepesme & Breuning, 1956
