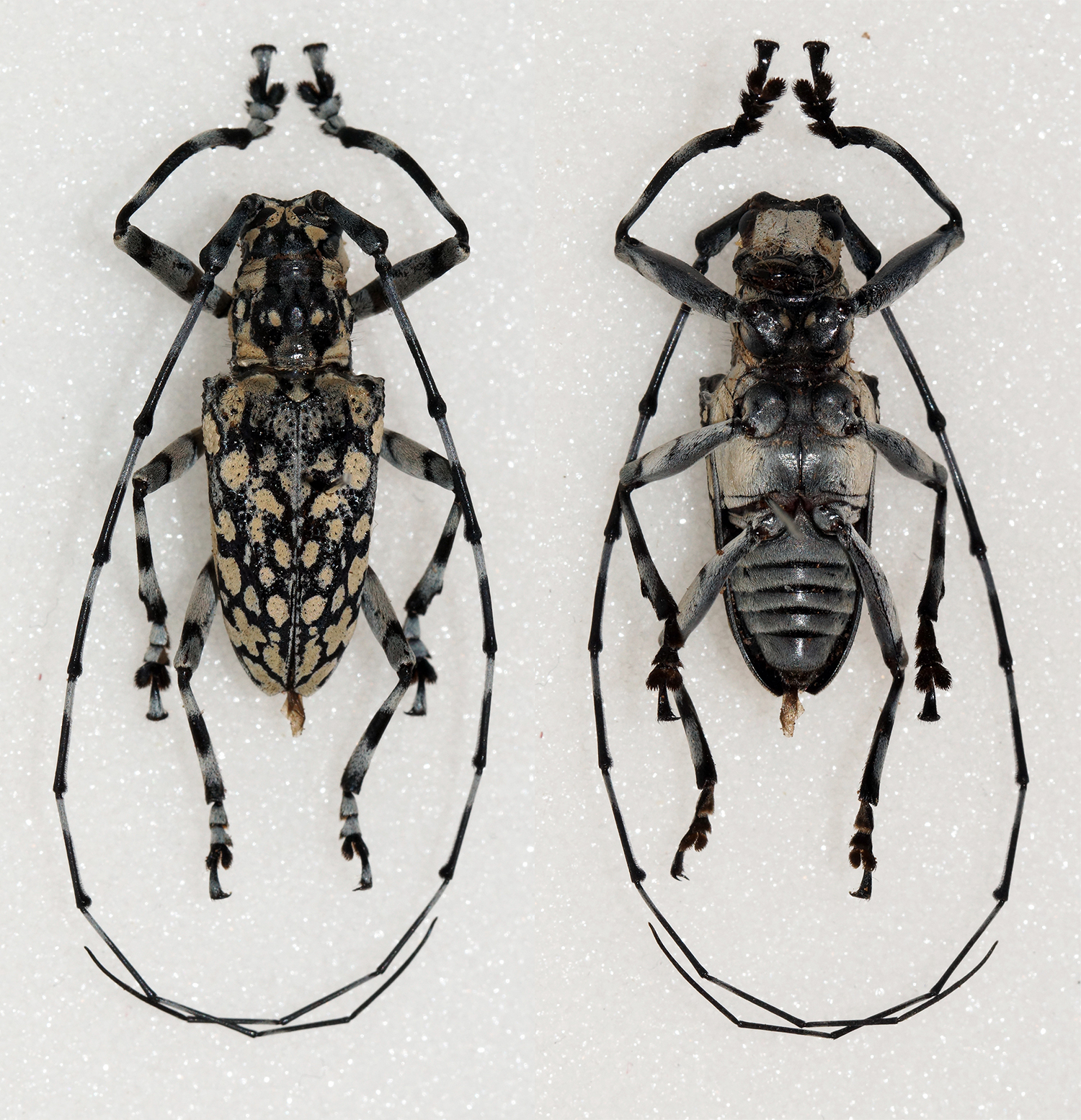

Scientific classification
- Kingdom: Animalia
- Phylum: Arthropoda
- Clade: Pancrustacea
- Class: Insecta
- Order: Coleoptera
- Suborder: Polyphaga
- Infraorder: Cucujiformia
- Family: Cerambycidae
- Genus: Palimna
- Species: P. annulata

Binomial name
- Palimna annulata (Olivier, 1792)

= Palimna annulata =

Species of beetle

Palimna annulata is a species of beetle in the family Cerambycidae. It was described by Guillaume-Antoine Olivier in 1792.
