= Dorcoeax ovalis =

Scientific classification
- Kingdom: Animalia
- Phylum: Arthropoda
- Clade: Pancrustacea
- Class: Insecta
- Order: Coleoptera
- Suborder: Polyphaga
- Infraorder: Cucujiformia
- Family: Cerambycidae
- Genus: Dorcoeax
- Species: D. ovalis

Binomial name
- Dorcoeax ovalis Breuning, 1946

Species of beetle

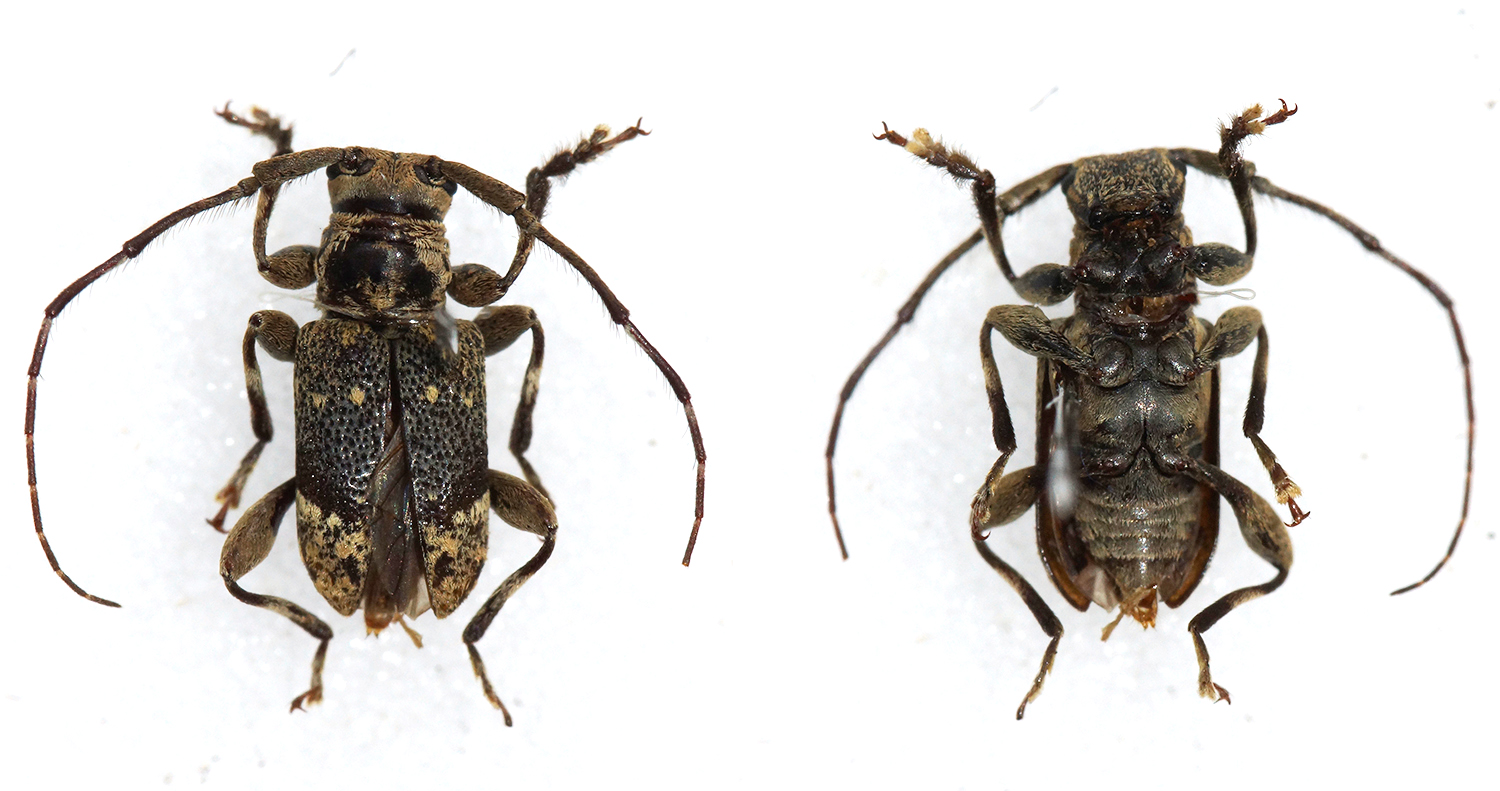
Dorcoeax ovalis

Dorcoeax ovalis is a species of beetle in the family Cerambycidae. It was described by Breuning in 1946.
