= Idactus maculicornis =

Scientific classification
- Domain: Eukaryota
- Kingdom: Animalia
- Phylum: Arthropoda
- Class: Insecta
- Order: Coleoptera
- Suborder: Polyphaga
- Infraorder: Cucujiformia
- Family: Cerambycidae
- Genus: Idactus
- Species: I. maculicornis

Binomial name
- Idactus maculicornis Gahan, 1890

Species of beetle

Idactus maculicornis is a species of beetle in the family Cerambycidae. It was described by Gahan in 1890.
