= Lasiopezus hiekei =

Scientific classification
- Kingdom: Animalia
- Phylum: Arthropoda
- Class: Insecta
- Order: Coleoptera
- Suborder: Polyphaga
- Infraorder: Cucujiformia
- Family: Cerambycidae
- Genus: Lasiopezus
- Species: L. hiekei

Binomial name
- Lasiopezus hiekei (Breuning, 1968)

Species of beetle

Lasiopezus hiekei is a species of beetle in the family Cerambycidae. It was described by Breuning in 1968.
