= Paroeax =

Scientific classification
- Kingdom: Animalia
- Phylum: Arthropoda
- Class: Insecta
- Order: Coleoptera
- Suborder: Polyphaga
- Infraorder: Cucujiformia
- Family: Cerambycidae
- Tribe: Ancylonotini
- Genus: Paroeax

Genus of beetles

Paroeax is a genus of longhorn beetles of the subfamily Lamiinae.

- Paroeax nasicornis (Pascoe, 1871)
- Paroeax schoutedeni Breuning, 1935
