= Idactus browni =

Scientific classification
- Kingdom: Animalia
- Phylum: Arthropoda
- Class: Insecta
- Order: Coleoptera
- Suborder: Polyphaga
- Infraorder: Cucujiformia
- Family: Cerambycidae
- Genus: Idactus
- Species: I. browni

Binomial name
- Idactus browni Breuning, 1981

Species of beetle

Idactus browni is a species of beetle in the family Cerambycidae. It was described by Breuning in 1981.
