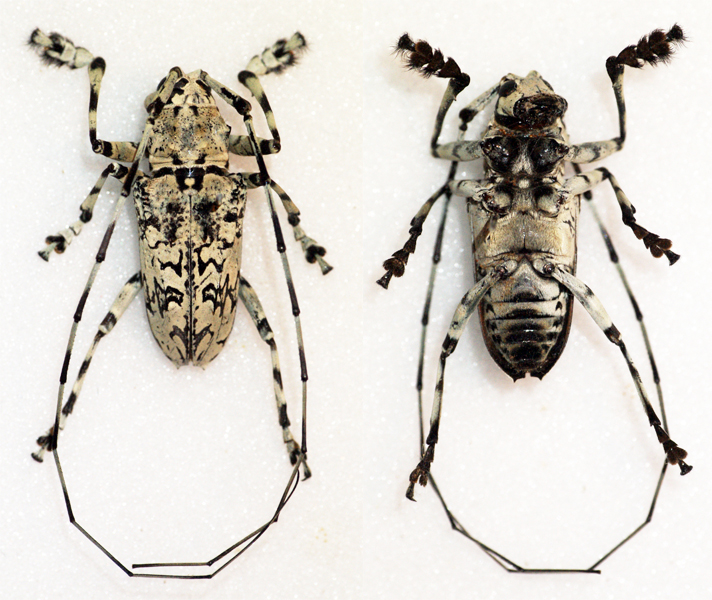

Scientific classification
- Kingdom: Animalia
- Phylum: Arthropoda
- Class: Insecta
- Order: Coleoptera
- Suborder: Polyphaga
- Infraorder: Cucujiformia
- Family: Cerambycidae
- Tribe: Ancylonotini
- Genus: Ancylonotus; Dejean, 1835
- Species: A. tribulus

Binomial name
- Ancylonotus tribulus (Fabricius, 1775)

= Ancylonotus =

Genus of beetles

Ancylonotus is a monotypic beetle genus in the family Cerambycidae described by Pierre François Marie Auguste Dejean in 1835. Its only species, Ancylonotus tribulus, was described by Johan Christian Fabricius in 1775.
