= Falsidactus =

Scientific classification
- Kingdom: Animalia
- Phylum: Arthropoda
- Class: Insecta
- Order: Coleoptera
- Suborder: Polyphaga
- Infraorder: Cucujiformia
- Family: Cerambycidae
- Tribe: Ancylonotini
- Genus: Falsidactus

Genus of beetles

Falsidactus is a genus of longhorn beetles of the subfamily Lamiinae.

- Falsidactus parabettoni (Breuning, 1970)
- Falsidactus vittatus (Hintz, 1910)
