= Idactus tuberculatus =

Scientific classification
- Domain: Eukaryota
- Kingdom: Animalia
- Phylum: Arthropoda
- Class: Insecta
- Order: Coleoptera
- Suborder: Polyphaga
- Infraorder: Cucujiformia
- Family: Cerambycidae
- Genus: Idactus
- Species: I. tuberculatus

Binomial name
- Idactus tuberculatus Quedenfeldt, 1885

Species of beetle

Idactus tuberculatus is a species of beetle in the family Cerambycidae. It was described by Quedenfeldt in 1885.
