= Latisternum simile =

Scientific classification
- Kingdom: Animalia
- Phylum: Arthropoda
- Class: Insecta
- Order: Coleoptera
- Suborder: Polyphaga
- Infraorder: Cucujiformia
- Family: Cerambycidae
- Genus: Latisternum
- Species: L. simile

Binomial name
- Latisternum simile Báguena & Breuning, 1958

Species of beetle

Latisternum simile is a species of beetle in the family Cerambycidae. It was described by Báguena and Breuning in 1958.
