= Oeax pygmaeus =

Scientific classification
- Domain: Eukaryota
- Kingdom: Animalia
- Phylum: Arthropoda
- Class: Insecta
- Order: Coleoptera
- Suborder: Polyphaga
- Infraorder: Cucujiformia
- Family: Cerambycidae
- Genus: Oeax
- Species: O. pygmaeus

Binomial name
- Oeax pygmaeus (Kolbe, 1893)

Species of beetle

Oeax pygmaeus is a species of beetle in the family Cerambycidae. It was described by Kolbe in 1893.
