= Idactus minimus =

Scientific classification
- Domain: Eukaryota
- Kingdom: Animalia
- Phylum: Arthropoda
- Class: Insecta
- Order: Coleoptera
- Suborder: Polyphaga
- Infraorder: Cucujiformia
- Family: Cerambycidae
- Genus: Idactus
- Species: I. minimus

Binomial name
- Idactus minimus Teocchi & Sudre, 2002

Species of beetle

Idactus minimus is a species of beetle in the family Cerambycidae. It was described by Teocchi and Sudre in 2002.
