= Falsidactus parabettoni =

Scientific classification
- Kingdom: Animalia
- Phylum: Arthropoda
- Class: Insecta
- Order: Coleoptera
- Suborder: Polyphaga
- Infraorder: Cucujiformia
- Family: Cerambycidae
- Genus: Falsidactus
- Species: F. parabettoni

Binomial name
- Falsidactus parabettoni (Breuning, 1970)

Species of beetle

Falsidactus parabettoni is a species of beetle in the family Cerambycidae. It was described by Breuning in 1970.
