= Dorcoeax =

Scientific classification
- Kingdom: Animalia
- Phylum: Arthropoda
- Class: Insecta
- Order: Coleoptera
- Suborder: Polyphaga
- Infraorder: Cucujiformia
- Family: Cerambycidae
- Tribe: Ancylonotini
- Genus: Dorcoeax

Genus of beetles

Dorcoeax is a genus of longhorn beetles of the subfamily Lamiinae.

- Dorcoeax bituberosoides (Breuning, 1969)
- Dorcoeax jadoti Téocchi, 2001
- Dorcoeax ovalis Breuning, 1946
