= Lasiopezus brunoi =

Scientific classification
- Kingdom: Animalia
- Phylum: Arthropoda
- Clade: Pancrustacea
- Class: Insecta
- Order: Coleoptera
- Suborder: Polyphaga
- Infraorder: Cucujiformia
- Family: Cerambycidae
- Genus: Lasiopezus
- Species: L. brunoi

Binomial name
- Lasiopezus brunoi Breuning, 1972

Species of beetle

Lasiopezus brunoi is a species of beetle in the family Cerambycidae. It was described by Breuning in 1972.

This species is native to:

- Ethiopia
- Kenya

No other species is listed as such.
