= Paridactus =

Scientific classification
- Kingdom: Animalia
- Phylum: Arthropoda
- Class: Insecta
- Order: Coleoptera
- Suborder: Polyphaga
- Infraorder: Cucujiformia
- Family: Cerambycidae
- Tribe: Ancylonotini
- Genus: Paridactus

Genus of beetles

Paridactus is a genus of longhorn beetles of the subfamily Lamiinae.

- Paridactus idactiformis Breuning, 1964
- Paridactus tarsalis Gahan, 1898
