= Palimna yunnana =

Scientific classification
- Kingdom: Animalia
- Phylum: Arthropoda
- Class: Insecta
- Order: Coleoptera
- Suborder: Polyphaga
- Infraorder: Cucujiformia
- Family: Cerambycidae
- Genus: Palimna
- Species: P. yunnana

Binomial name
- Palimna yunnana Breuning, 1935

Species of beetle

Palimna yunnana is a species of beetle in the family Cerambycidae. It was described by Breuning in 1935.
