= Gigantopalimna =

Scientific classification
- Kingdom: Animalia
- Phylum: Arthropoda
- Class: Insecta
- Order: Coleoptera
- Suborder: Polyphaga
- Infraorder: Cucujiformia
- Family: Cerambycidae
- Genus: Gigantopalimna
- Species: G. benetrixae

Binomial name
- Gigantopalimna benetrixae Breuning, 1964

Genus of beetles

Gigantopalimna benetrixae is a species of beetle in the family Cerambycidae, and the only species in the genus Gigantopalimna. It was described by Breuning in 1964.
