= Parapezus =

Scientific classification
- Kingdom: Animalia
- Phylum: Arthropoda
- Class: Insecta
- Order: Coleoptera
- Suborder: Polyphaga
- Infraorder: Cucujiformia
- Family: Cerambycidae
- Genus: Parapezus
- Species: P. angolensis

Binomial name
- Parapezus angolensis Breuning, 1938

Genus of beetles

Parapezus angolensis is a species of beetle in the family Cerambycidae, and the only species in the genus Parapezus. It was described by Breuning in 1938.
