= Agranolamia =

Scientific classification
- Kingdom: Animalia
- Phylum: Arthropoda
- Class: Insecta
- Order: Coleoptera
- Suborder: Polyphaga
- Infraorder: Cucujiformia
- Family: Cerambycidae
- Genus: Agranolamia
- Species: A. poensis

Binomial name
- Agranolamia poensis Báguena, 1952

Genus of beetles

Agranolamia is a genus of beetles in the family Cerambycidae, containing a single species, Agranolamia poensis. It was described by Báguena in 1952.
