= Mimocularia =

Scientific classification
- Kingdom: Animalia
- Phylum: Arthropoda
- Class: Insecta
- Order: Coleoptera
- Suborder: Polyphaga
- Infraorder: Cucujiformia
- Family: Cerambycidae
- Genus: Mimocularia
- Species: M. cineracea

Binomial name
- Mimocularia cineracea Breuning, 1970

Genus of beetles

Mimocularia cineracea is a species of beetle in the family Cerambycidae, and the only species in the genus Mimocularia. It was described by Stephan von Breuning in 1970.
