= Trichoeax =

Scientific classification
- Kingdom: Animalia
- Phylum: Arthropoda
- Class: Insecta
- Order: Coleoptera
- Suborder: Polyphaga
- Infraorder: Cucujiformia
- Family: Cerambycidae
- Genus: Trichoeax
- Species: T. somaliensis

Binomial name
- Trichoeax somaliensis Breuning, 1938

Genus of beetles

Trichoeax somaliensis is a species of beetle in the family Cerambycidae, and the only species in the genus Trichoeax. It was described by Breuning in 1938.
