= Pseudidactus =

Scientific classification
- Kingdom: Animalia
- Phylum: Arthropoda
- Clade: Pancrustacea
- Class: Insecta
- Order: Coleoptera
- Suborder: Polyphaga
- Infraorder: Cucujiformia
- Family: Cerambycidae
- Genus: Pseudidactus
- Species: P. roggemani

Binomial name
- Pseudidactus roggemani Breuning, 1977

Genus of beetles

Pseudidactus roggemani is a species of beetle in the family Cerambycidae, and the only species in the genus Pseudidactus. It was described by Breuning in 1977.
