= Apalimnodes =

Scientific classification
- Kingdom: Animalia
- Phylum: Arthropoda
- Class: Insecta
- Order: Coleoptera
- Suborder: Polyphaga
- Infraorder: Cucujiformia
- Family: Cerambycidae
- Genus: Apalimnodes
- Species: A. granulatus

Binomial name
- Apalimnodes granulatus Franz, 1966

Genus of beetles

Apalimnodes granulatus is a species of beetle in the family Cerambycidae, and the only species in the genus Apalimnodes. It was described by Franz in 1966.
