= Palimnodes =

Scientific classification
- Kingdom: Animalia
- Phylum: Arthropoda
- Class: Insecta
- Order: Coleoptera
- Suborder: Polyphaga
- Infraorder: Cucujiformia
- Family: Cerambycidae
- Genus: Palimnodes
- Species: P. ducalis

Binomial name
- Palimnodes ducalis (Bates, 1884)

Genus of beetles

Palimnodes ducalis is a species of beetle in the family Cerambycidae, and the only species in the genus Palimnodes. It was described by Henry Walter Bates in 1884.
