= Stenophloeus =

Scientific classification
- Kingdom: Animalia
- Phylum: Arthropoda
- Class: Insecta
- Order: Coleoptera
- Suborder: Polyphaga
- Infraorder: Cucujiformia
- Family: Cerambycidae
- Genus: Stenophloeus
- Species: S. ocularis

Binomial name
- Stenophloeus ocularis (Hintz, 1910)

Genus of beetles

Stenophloeus ocularis is a species of beetle in the family Cerambycidae, and the only species in the genus Stenophloeus. It was described by Hintz in 1910.
