= Sarathropezus =

Scientific classification
- Kingdom: Animalia
- Phylum: Arthropoda
- Class: Insecta
- Order: Coleoptera
- Suborder: Polyphaga
- Infraorder: Cucujiformia
- Family: Cerambycidae
- Genus: Sarathropezus
- Species: S. conicipennis

Binomial name
- Sarathropezus conicipennis Kolbe, 1893

Genus of beetles

Sarathropezus conicipennis is a species of beetle in the family Cerambycidae, and the only species in the genus Sarathropezus. It was described by Kolbe in 1893.
