= Mimopezus =

Scientific classification
- Kingdom: Animalia
- Phylum: Arthropoda
- Class: Insecta
- Order: Coleoptera
- Suborder: Polyphaga
- Infraorder: Cucujiformia
- Family: Cerambycidae
- Genus: Mimopezus
- Species: M. pujoli

Binomial name
- Mimopezus pujoli Breuning, 1970

Genus of beetles

Mimopezus pujoli is a species of beetle in the family Cerambycidae, and the only species in the genus Mimopezus. It was described by Breuning in 1970.
