= Paraderpas =

Scientific classification
- Kingdom: Animalia
- Phylum: Arthropoda
- Class: Insecta
- Order: Coleoptera
- Suborder: Polyphaga
- Infraorder: Cucujiformia
- Family: Cerambycidae
- Genus: Paraderpas
- Species: P. decellei

Binomial name
- Paraderpas decellei Breuning, 1968

Genus of beetles

Paraderpas decellei is a species of beetle in the family Cerambycidae, and the only species in the genus Paraderpas. It was described by Breuning in 1968.
