= Paralatisternum =

Scientific classification
- Kingdom: Animalia
- Phylum: Arthropoda
- Class: Insecta
- Order: Coleoptera
- Suborder: Polyphaga
- Infraorder: Cucujiformia
- Family: Cerambycidae
- Genus: Paralatisternum
- Species: P. ochreofasciculosum

Binomial name
- Paralatisternum ochreofasciculosum Breuning, 1963

Genus of beetles

Paralatisternum ochreofasciculosum is a species of beetle in the family Cerambycidae, and the only species in the genus Paralatisternum. It was described by Breuning in 1963.
