= Prosidactus =

Scientific classification
- Kingdom: Animalia
- Phylum: Arthropoda
- Class: Insecta
- Order: Coleoptera
- Suborder: Polyphaga
- Infraorder: Cucujiformia
- Family: Cerambycidae
- Genus: Prosidactus
- Species: P. bartolozii

Binomial name
- Prosidactus bartolozii Teocchi et al., 2010

Genus of beetles

Prosidactus bartolozii is a species of beetle in the family Cerambycidae, and the only species in the genus Prosidactus. It was described by Teocchi et al. in 2010.
