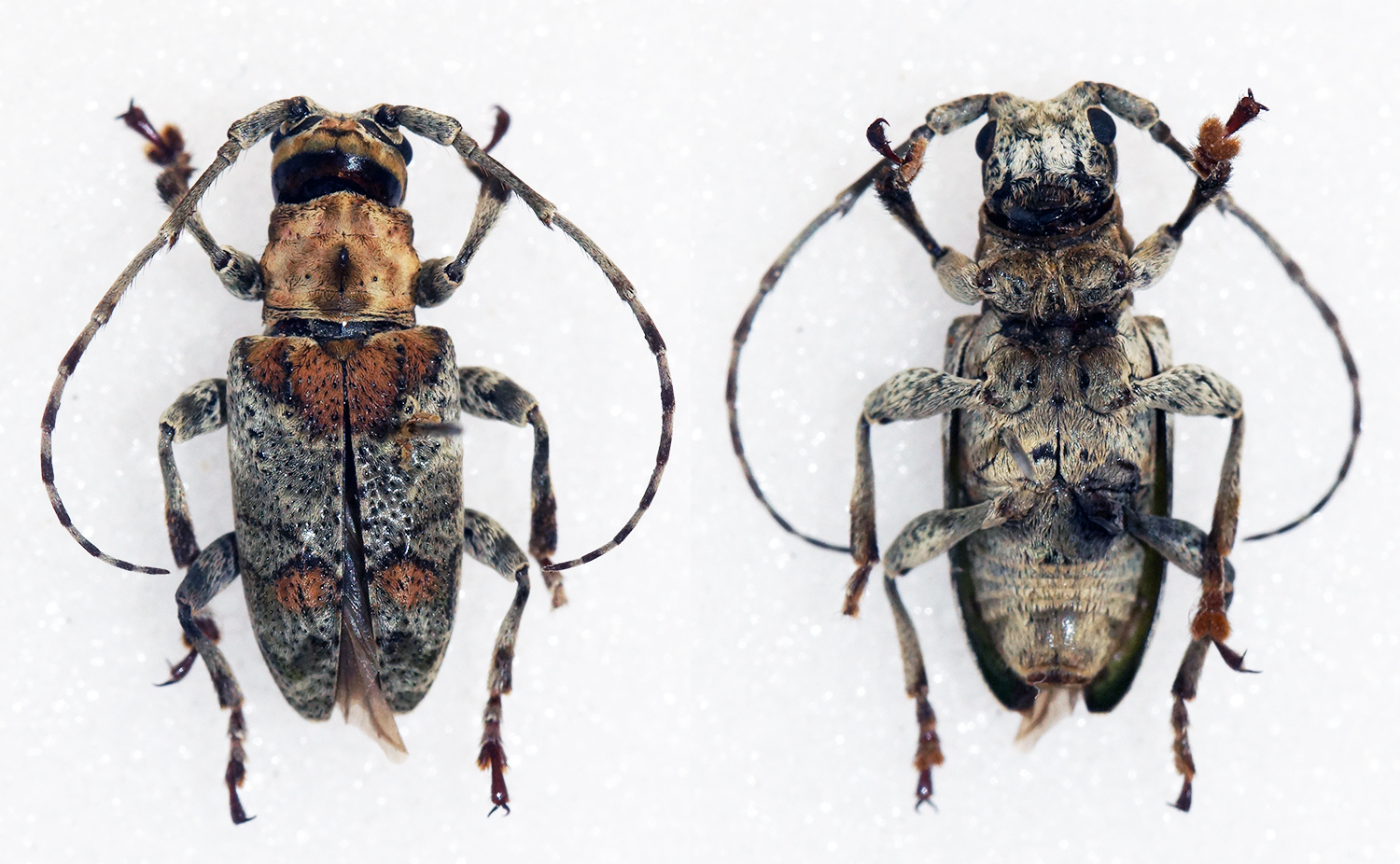
- Oeax collaris

Scientific classification
- Kingdom: Animalia
- Phylum: Arthropoda
- Class: Insecta
- Order: Coleoptera
- Suborder: Polyphaga
- Infraorder: Cucujiformia
- Family: Cerambycidae
- Subfamily: Lamiinae
- Genus: Oeax

= Oeax =

Genus of beetles

Oeax is a genus of longhorn beetles of the subfamily Lamiinae.

- Oeax albosignatus Breuning, 1952
- Oeax collaris Jordan, 1903
- Oeax griseus Breuning, 1951
- Oeax latefasciatus Breuning, 1978
- Oeax lateralis Jordan, 1903
- Oeax lichenea Duvivier, 1891
- Oeax marshalli Breuning, 1935
- Oeax obtusicollis Breuning, 1939
- Oeax paralateralis Breuning, 1977
- Oeax petriclaudii (Quentin & Villiers, 1981)
- Oeax pygmaeus (Kolbe, 1893)
- Oeax rufescens Breuning, 1939
- Oeax similis Breuning, 1986
- Oeax subaequalis Breuning, 1955
- Oeax transversus (Aurivillius, 1913)
- Oeax triangularis (White, 1858)
- Oeax tricuspis Báguena, 1952
- Oeax ugandae Breuning, 1971
