= Niphona lateralis =

Scientific classification
- Kingdom: Animalia
- Phylum: Arthropoda
- Class: Insecta
- Order: Coleoptera
- Suborder: Polyphaga
- Infraorder: Cucujiformia
- Family: Cerambycidae
- Genus: Niphona
- Species: N. lateralis

Binomial name
- Niphona lateralis White, 1858

Synonyms
- Mylothris bimaculatus Brongniart, 1891

Species of beetle

Niphona lateralis is a species of beetle in the family Cerambycidae. It was described by White in 1858. It is known from Thailand, Borneo, Cambodia and Malaysia.
