= Niphona stoetzneri =

Scientific classification
- Kingdom: Animalia
- Phylum: Arthropoda
- Class: Insecta
- Order: Coleoptera
- Suborder: Polyphaga
- Infraorder: Cucujiformia
- Family: Cerambycidae
- Genus: Niphona
- Species: N. stoetzneri

Binomial name
- Niphona stoetzneri Breuning, 1938

Species of beetle

Niphona stoetzneri is a species of beetle in the family Cerambycidae. It was described by Stephan von Breuning in 1938. The species is named after Walther Stötzner who led an expedition into China during which the first described specimens were collected.
