= Niphona albolateralis =

Scientific classification
- Kingdom: Animalia
- Phylum: Arthropoda
- Class: Insecta
- Order: Coleoptera
- Suborder: Polyphaga
- Infraorder: Cucujiformia
- Family: Cerambycidae
- Genus: Niphona
- Species: N. albolateralis

Binomial name
- Niphona albolateralis Pic, 1926

Species of beetle

Niphona albolateralis is a species of beetle in the family Cerambycidae, described by Maurice Pic in 1926.
