= Niphona paraparallela =

Scientific classification
- Kingdom: Animalia
- Phylum: Arthropoda
- Clade: Pancrustacea
- Class: Insecta
- Order: Coleoptera
- Suborder: Polyphaga
- Infraorder: Cucujiformia
- Family: Cerambycidae
- Genus: Niphona
- Species: N. paraparallela

Binomial name
- Niphona paraparallela Breuning, 1979

Synonyms
- Niphona parallela Breuning, 1972 nec White, 1858

Species of beetle

Niphona paraparallela is a species of beetle in the family Cerambycidae. It was described by Stephan von Breuning in 1979. It is known from Vietnam.
