= Niphona princeps =

Scientific classification
- Kingdom: Animalia
- Phylum: Arthropoda
- Class: Insecta
- Order: Coleoptera
- Suborder: Polyphaga
- Infraorder: Cucujiformia
- Family: Cerambycidae
- Tribe: Pteropliini
- Genus: Niphona
- Species: N. princeps

Binomial name
- Niphona princeps Gahan, 1894

Species of beetle

Niphona princeps is a species of beetle in the family Cerambycidae. It was described by Charles Joseph Gahan in 1894. It is known from Myanmar.
