= Niphona lateraliplagiata =

Scientific classification
- Kingdom: Animalia
- Phylum: Arthropoda
- Class: Insecta
- Order: Coleoptera
- Suborder: Polyphaga
- Infraorder: Cucujiformia
- Family: Cerambycidae
- Genus: Niphona
- Species: N. lateraliplagiata

Binomial name
- Niphona lateraliplagiata Breuning & Itzinger, 1943

Species of beetle

Niphona lateraliplagiata is a species of beetle in the family Cerambycidae. It was described by Stephan von Breuning and Itzinger in 1943. It is known from Myanmar, China and Vietnam.
