= Niphona obliquata =

Scientific classification
- Kingdom: Animalia
- Phylum: Arthropoda
- Class: Insecta
- Order: Coleoptera
- Suborder: Polyphaga
- Infraorder: Cucujiformia
- Family: Cerambycidae
- Genus: Niphona
- Species: N. obliquata

Binomial name
- Niphona obliquata Breuning, 1938

Species of beetle

Niphona obliquata is a species of beetle in the family Cerambycidae. It was described by Stephan von Breuning in 1938.
