= Niphona appendiculata =

Scientific classification
- Kingdom: Animalia
- Phylum: Arthropoda
- Class: Insecta
- Order: Coleoptera
- Suborder: Polyphaga
- Infraorder: Cucujiformia
- Family: Cerambycidae
- Tribe: Pteropliini
- Genus: Niphona
- Species: N. appendiculata

Binomial name
- Niphona appendiculata Gerstaecker, 1871

Synonyms
- Aelara severa Duvivier, 1892; Hecyra sordida Fahraeus, 1872; Niphona appendiculata m. bellina Breuning & Téocchi, 1982

Species of beetle

Niphona appendiculata is a species of beetle in the family Cerambycidae. It was described by Carl Eduard Adolph Gerstaecker in 1871.
