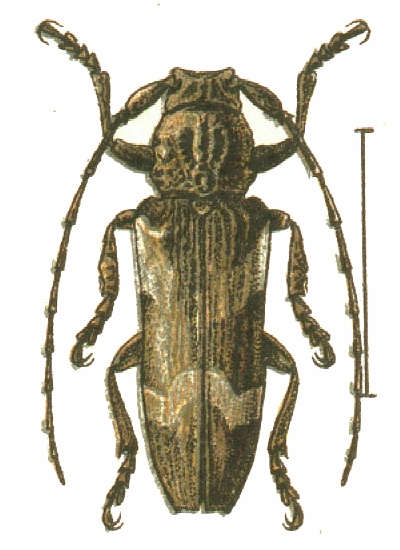
- Niphona picticornis

Scientific classification
- Kingdom: Animalia
- Phylum: Arthropoda
- Class: Insecta
- Order: Coleoptera
- Suborder: Polyphaga
- Infraorder: Cucujiformia
- Family: Cerambycidae
- Subfamily: Lamiinae
- Tribe: Pteropliini
- Genus: Niphona; Mulsant, 1839

= Niphona =

Genus of beetles

Niphona is a genus of longhorn beetles of the subfamily Lamiinae, containing the following species:

subgenus Hammatoniphona

- Niphona longicornis (Pic, 1926)

subgenus Niphona

- Niphona affinis Breuning, 1938
- Niphona albofasciata Breuning, 1938
- Niphona albolateralis Pic, 1926
- Niphona alboplagiata Breuning, 1938
- Niphona albosignatipennis Breuning, 1968
- Niphona andamana Breuning, 1974
- Niphona andamanica Breuning, 1938
- Niphona appendiculata Gerstaecker, 1871
- Niphona appendiculatoides Breuning, 1964
- Niphona arrogans Pascoe, 1862
- Niphona batesi Gahan, 1895
- Niphona belligerans Pesarini & Sabbadini, 1997
- Niphona borneana Breuning, 1973
- Niphona borneensis Breuning, 1938
- Niphona cantonensis Pic, 1936
- Niphona celebensis Breuning, 1961
- Niphona chapaensis Pic, 1936
- Niphona chinensis Breuning, 1938
- Niphona crampeli Breuning, 1961
- Niphona dessumi Breuning, 1961
- Niphona excisa Pascoe, 1862
- Niphona falaizei Breuning, 1962
- Niphona fasciculata (Pic, 1917)
- Niphona furcata (Bates, 1873)
- Niphona fuscatrix (Fabricius, 1792)
- Niphona gracilior Breuning, 1952
- Niphona grisea Breuning, 1938
- Niphona hepaticolor (Heller, 1923)
- Niphona hookeri Gahan, 1900
- Niphona indica Breuning, 1938
- Niphona javana Franz, 1971
- Niphona lateraliplagiata Breuning & Itzinger, 1943
- Niphona lateralis White, 1858
- Niphona laterialba Breuning, 1938
- Niphona lateriplagiata Breuning, 1943
- Niphona longesignata Pic, 1936
- Niphona lumawigi Breuning, 1980
- Niphona lunulata (Pic, 1926)
- Niphona lutea (Pic, 1925)
- Niphona malaccensis Breuning, 1938
- Niphona mediofasciata Breuning, 1968
- Niphona micropuncticollis Breuning & Chujô, 1961
- Niphona nigrohumeralis Breuning, 1938
- Niphona obliquata Breuning, 1938
- Niphona obscura Breuning, 1938
- Niphona orientalis Breuning, 1938
- Niphona ornata Gahan, 1895
- Niphona ornatoides Breuning, 1938
- Niphona pannosa Pascoe, 1862
- Niphona parallela White, 1858
- Niphona paraparallela Breuning, 1979
- Niphona philippinensis Breuning, 1964
- Niphona picticornis Mulsant, 1839
- Niphona plagiata White, 1858
- Niphona plagiatoides Breuning, 1938
- Niphona plagifera Aurivillius, 1925
- Niphona pluricristata Pesarini & Sabbadini, 1999
- Niphona princeps Gahan, 1894
- Niphona proxima Breuning, 1938
- Niphona regisfernandi Paiva, 1860
- Niphona rondoni Breuning, 1962
- Niphona similis Breuning, 1938
- Niphona stoetzneri Breuning, 1938
- Niphona stramentosa Breuning, 1938
- Niphona subgrisea Breuning, 1973
- Niphona sublutea Breuning, 1964
- Niphona subobscura Breuning, 1968
- Niphona sumatrana Breuning, 1942
- Niphona tibialis Gahan, 1893
- Niphona variegata Breuning, 1938
- Niphona vicina Gahan, 1896
- Niphona yanoi Matsushita, 1934
