= Niphona regisfernandi =

Scientific classification
- Kingdom: Animalia
- Phylum: Arthropoda
- Class: Insecta
- Order: Coleoptera
- Suborder: Polyphaga
- Infraorder: Cucujiformia
- Family: Cerambycidae
- Tribe: Pteropliini
- Genus: Niphona
- Species: N. regisfernandi

Binomial name
- Niphona regisfernandi Paiva, 1860

Species of beetle

Niphona regisfernandi is a species of beetle in the family Cerambycidae. It was described by Paiva in 1860.
