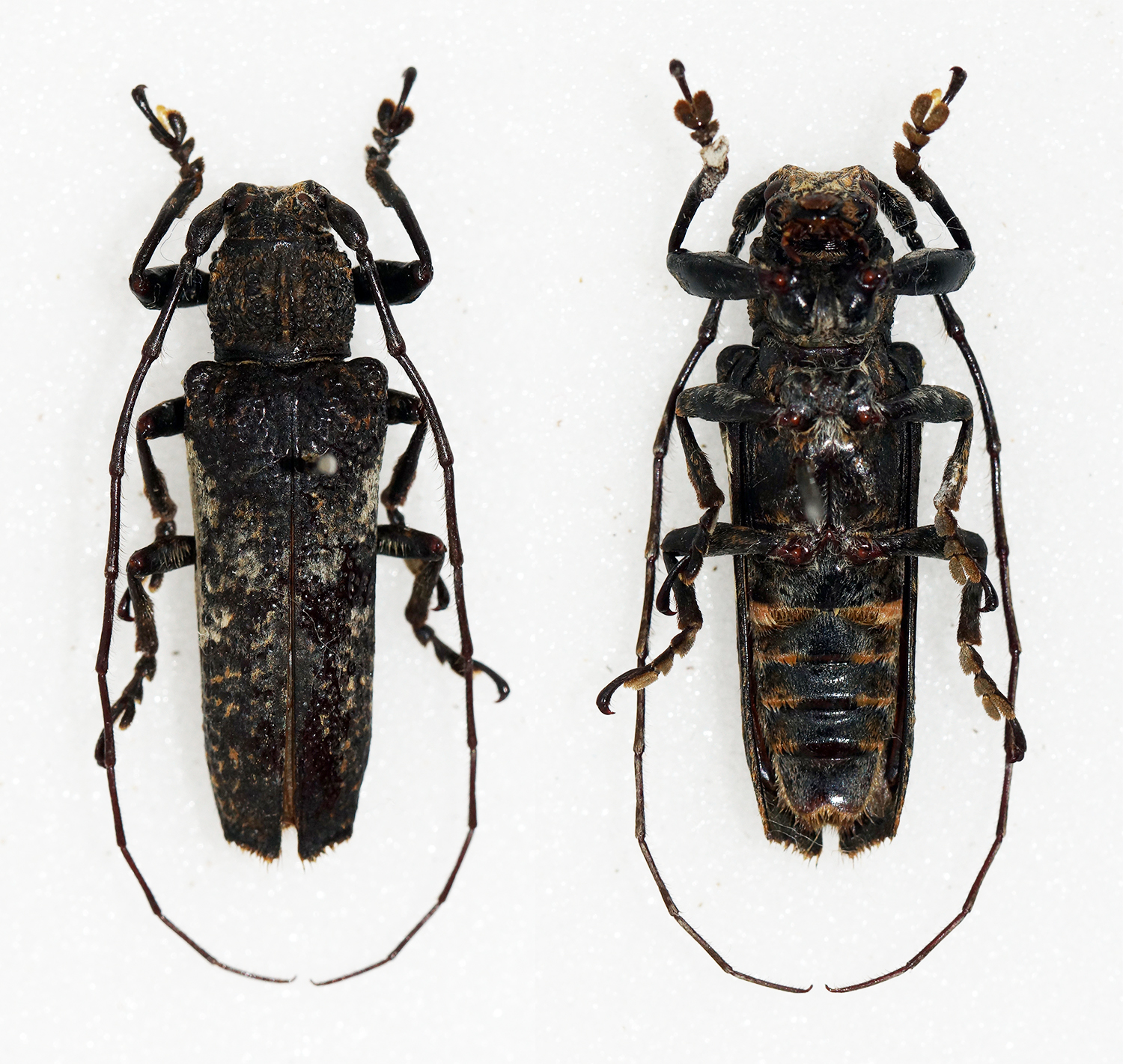

Scientific classification
- Kingdom: Animalia
- Phylum: Arthropoda
- Class: Insecta
- Order: Coleoptera
- Suborder: Polyphaga
- Infraorder: Cucujiformia
- Family: Cerambycidae
- Genus: Niphona
- Species: N. longicornis

Binomial name
- Niphona longicornis (Pic, 1926)

= Niphona longicornis =

Species of beetle

Niphona longicornis is a species of beetle in the family Cerambycidae. It was described by Maurice Pic in 1926.
