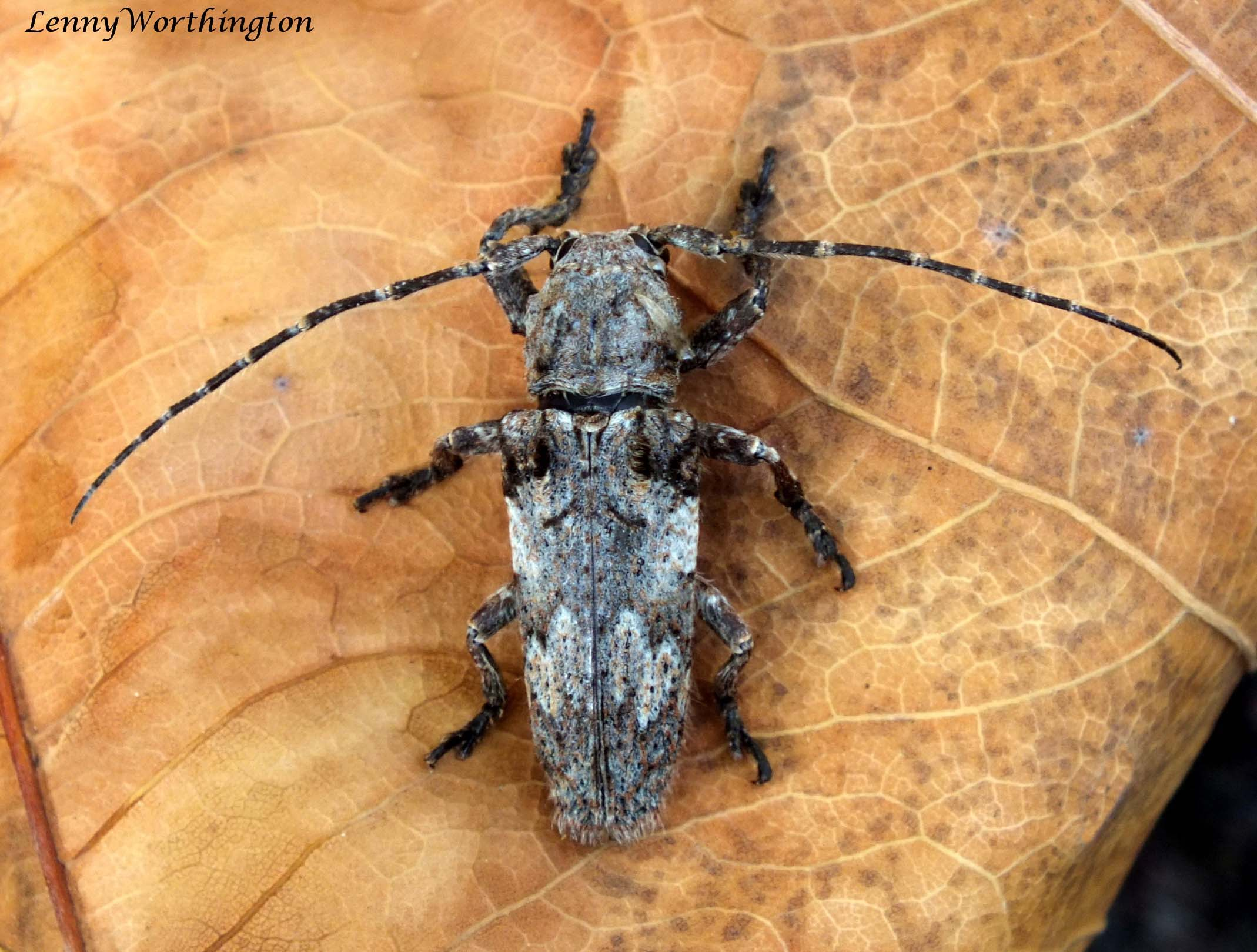

Scientific classification
- Kingdom: Animalia
- Phylum: Arthropoda
- Clade: Pancrustacea
- Class: Insecta
- Order: Coleoptera
- Suborder: Polyphaga
- Infraorder: Cucujiformia
- Family: Cerambycidae
- Genus: Niphona
- Species: N. rondoni

Binomial name
- Niphona rondoni Breuning, 1962

= Niphona rondoni =

Species of beetle

Niphona rondoni is a species of beetle in the family Cerambycidae. It was described by Stephan von Breuning in 1962. It is known from Laos.
