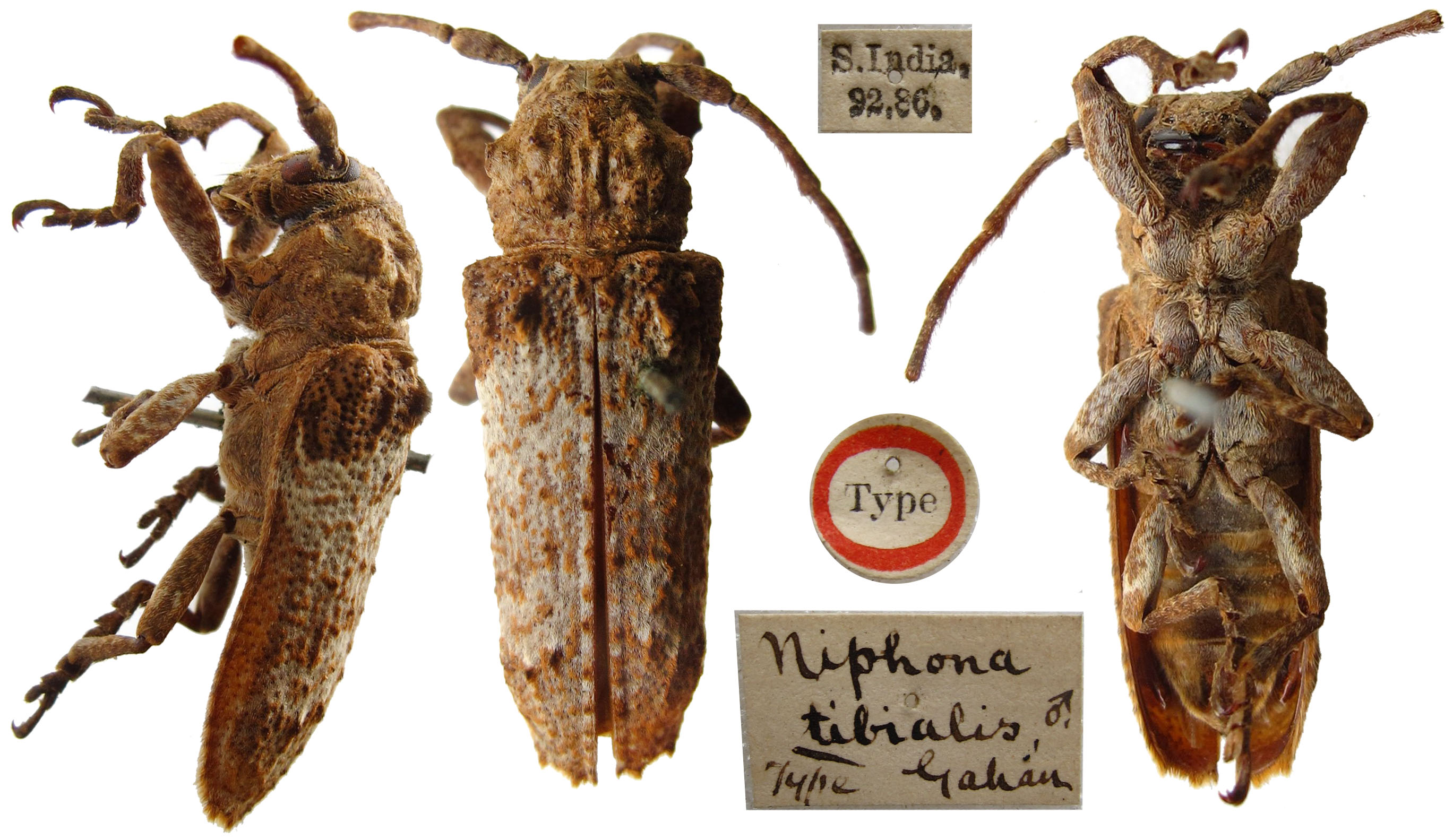

Scientific classification
- Kingdom: Animalia
- Phylum: Arthropoda
- Class: Insecta
- Order: Coleoptera
- Suborder: Polyphaga
- Infraorder: Cucujiformia
- Family: Cerambycidae
- Tribe: Pteropliini
- Genus: Niphona
- Species: N. tibialis

Binomial name
- Niphona tibialis Gahan, 1893

= Niphona tibialis =

Species of beetle

Niphona tibialis is a species of beetle in the family Cerambycidae. It was described by Charles Joseph Gahan in 1893. It is known from India.
