= Niphona ornata =

Scientific classification
- Kingdom: Animalia
- Phylum: Arthropoda
- Class: Insecta
- Order: Coleoptera
- Suborder: Polyphaga
- Infraorder: Cucujiformia
- Family: Cerambycidae
- Tribe: Pteropliini
- Genus: Niphona
- Species: N. ornata

Binomial name
- Niphona ornata Gahan, 1895

Species of beetle

Niphona ornata is a species of beetle in the family Cerambycidae. It was described by Charles Joseph Gahan in 1895.
