= Niphona furcata =

Scientific classification
- Kingdom: Animalia
- Phylum: Arthropoda
- Clade: Pancrustacea
- Class: Insecta
- Order: Coleoptera
- Suborder: Polyphaga
- Infraorder: Cucujiformia
- Family: Cerambycidae
- Genus: Niphona
- Species: N. furcata

Binomial name
- Niphona furcata (Bates, 1873)

Synonyms
- Aelara furcata Bates, 1873

Species of beetle

Niphona furcata is a species of beetle in the family Cerambycidae. It was described by Henry Walter Bates in 1873. It is known from Japan, Taiwan, South Korea, and China. It acts as a parasitoid for the wasp Neurocrassus palliatus.
