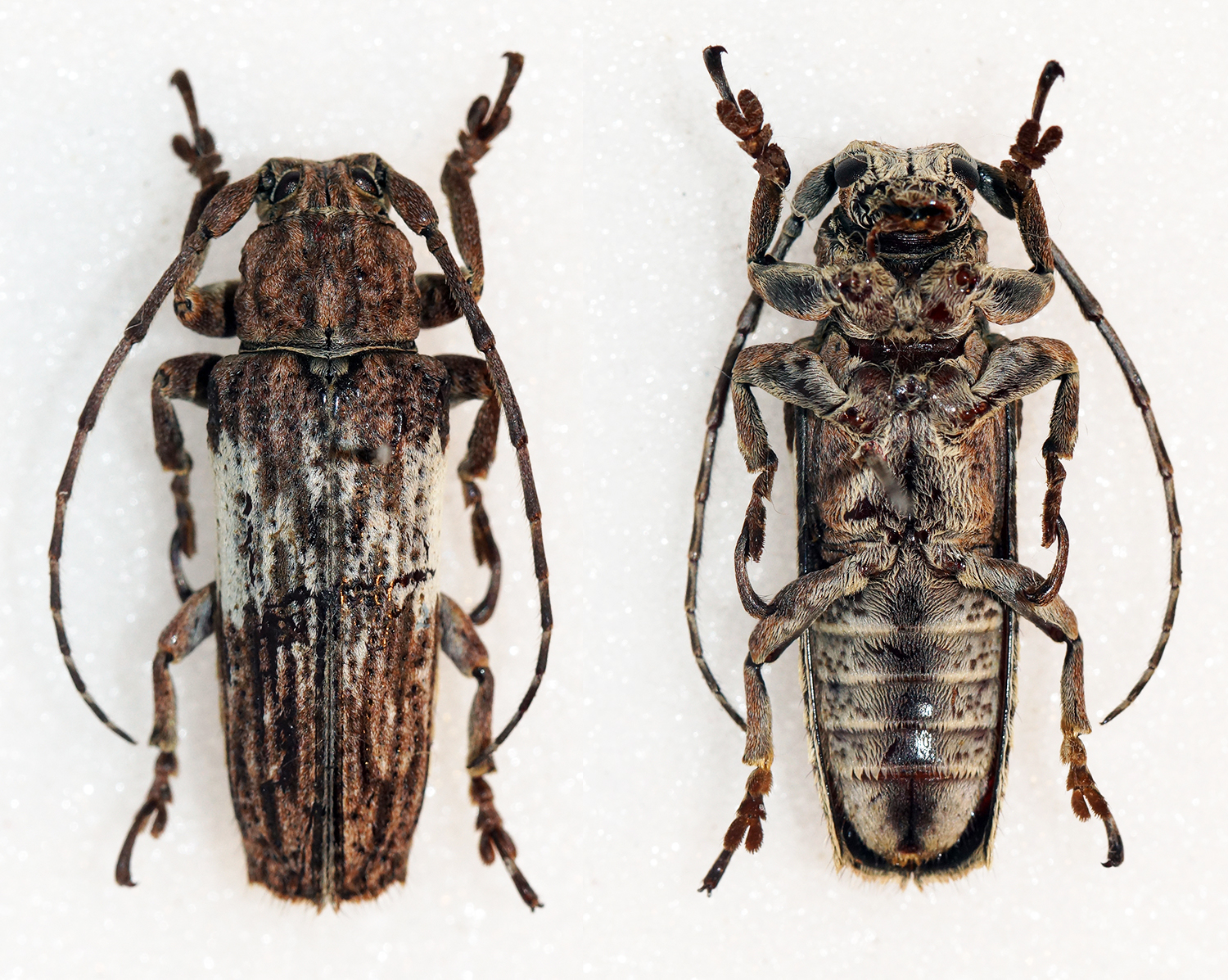

Scientific classification
- Kingdom: Animalia
- Phylum: Arthropoda
- Clade: Pancrustacea
- Class: Insecta
- Order: Coleoptera
- Suborder: Polyphaga
- Infraorder: Cucujiformia
- Family: Cerambycidae
- Genus: Niphona
- Species: N. albosignatipennis

Binomial name
- Niphona albosignatipennis Breuning, 1968

= Niphona albosignatipennis =

Species of beetle

Niphona albosignatipennis is a species of beetle in the family Cerambycidae found in Asia in countries such as Borneo, Sumatra and Malaysia.
