= Niphona lutea =

Scientific classification
- Kingdom: Animalia
- Phylum: Arthropoda
- Class: Insecta
- Order: Coleoptera
- Suborder: Polyphaga
- Infraorder: Cucujiformia
- Family: Cerambycidae
- Genus: Niphona
- Species: N. lutea

Binomial name
- Niphona lutea (Pic, 1925)

Synonyms
- Falsoniphona lutea Pic, 1925

Species of beetle

Niphona lutea is a species of beetle in the family Cerambycidae. It was described by Maurice Pic in 1925.
