= Niphona yanoi =

Scientific classification
- Kingdom: Animalia
- Phylum: Arthropoda
- Class: Insecta
- Order: Coleoptera
- Suborder: Polyphaga
- Infraorder: Cucujiformia
- Family: Cerambycidae
- Tribe: Pteropliini
- Genus: Niphona
- Species: N. yanoi

Binomial name
- Niphona yanoi Matsushita, 1934

Species of beetle

Niphona yanoi is a species of beetle in the family Cerambycidae. It was described by Masaki Matsushita in 1934, and is known to be from Taiwan and Japan.
