= Niphona micropuncticollis =

Scientific classification
- Kingdom: Animalia
- Phylum: Arthropoda
- Class: Insecta
- Order: Coleoptera
- Suborder: Polyphaga
- Infraorder: Cucujiformia
- Family: Cerambycidae
- Genus: Niphona
- Species: N. micropuncticollis

Binomial name
- Niphona micropuncticollis Breuning & Chujô, 1961

Species of beetle

Niphona micropuncticollis is a species of beetle in the family Cerambycidae. It was described by Stephan von Breuning and Chujô in 1961. It is known from Thailand.
