= Niphona hepaticolor =

Scientific classification
- Kingdom: Animalia
- Phylum: Arthropoda
- Clade: Pancrustacea
- Class: Insecta
- Order: Coleoptera
- Suborder: Polyphaga
- Infraorder: Cucujiformia
- Family: Cerambycidae
- Genus: Niphona
- Species: N. hepaticolor

Binomial name
- Niphona hepaticolor (Heller, 1923)

Synonyms
- Mylothris hepaticolor Heller, 1923

Species of beetle

Niphona hepaticolor is a species of beetle in the family Cerambycidae. It was described by Heller in 1923. It is known from Moluccas, Java, the Philippines and Borneo.
