= Niphona plagiata =

Scientific classification
- Kingdom: Animalia
- Phylum: Arthropoda
- Class: Insecta
- Order: Coleoptera
- Suborder: Polyphaga
- Infraorder: Cucujiformia
- Family: Cerambycidae
- Tribe: Pteropliini
- Genus: Niphona
- Species: N. plagiata

Binomial name
- Niphona plagiata White, 1858

Species of beetle

Niphona plagiata is a species of beetle in the family Cerambycidae. It was described by White in 1858.
