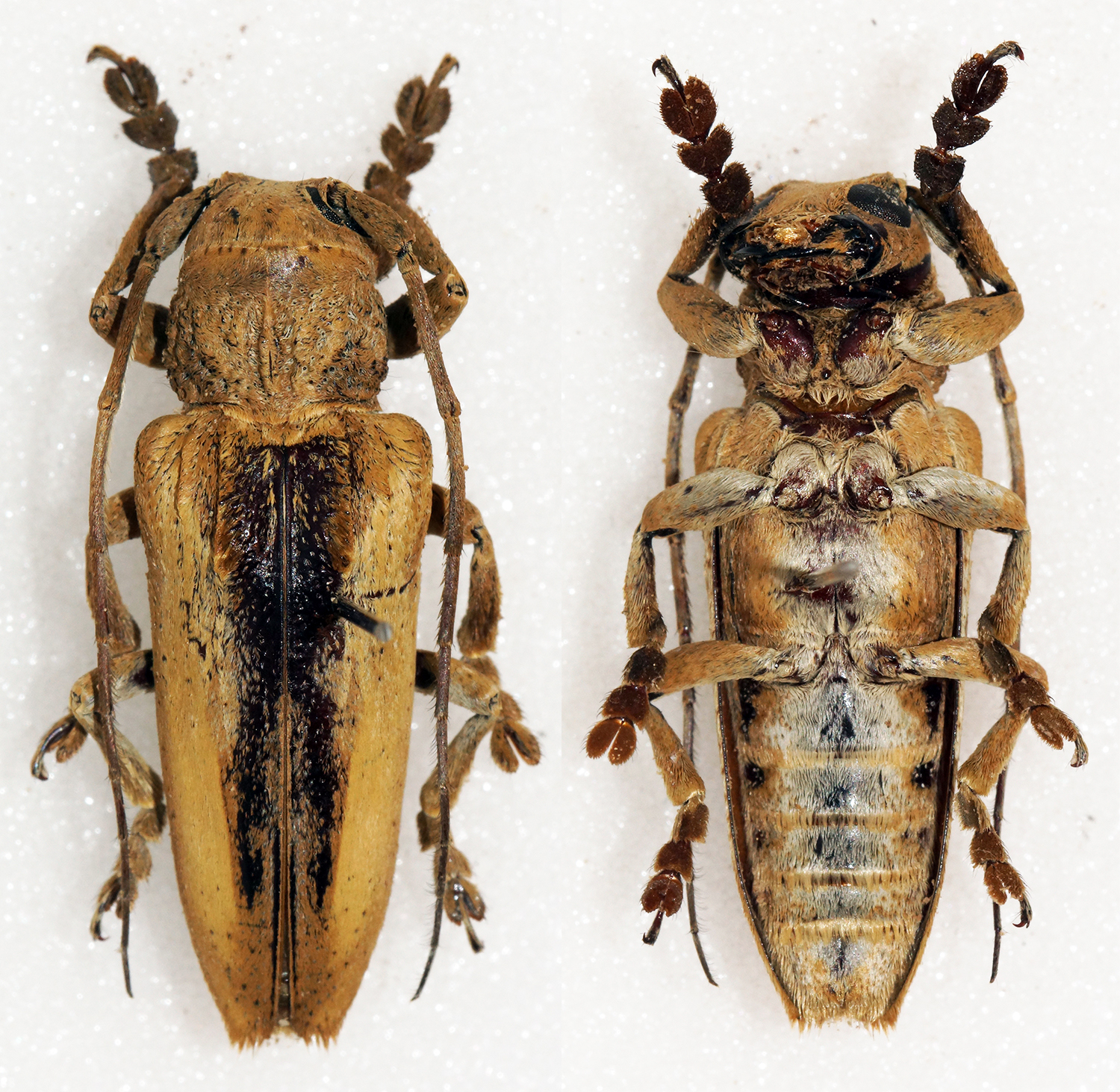

Scientific classification
- Kingdom: Animalia
- Phylum: Arthropoda
- Class: Insecta
- Order: Coleoptera
- Suborder: Polyphaga
- Infraorder: Cucujiformia
- Family: Cerambycidae
- Genus: Niphona
- Species: N. longesignata

Binomial name
- Niphona longesignata Pic, 1936

= Niphona longesignata =

Species of beetle

Niphona longesignata is a species of beetle in the family Cerambycidae. It was described by Maurice Pic in 1936. It is known from Vietnam.
