= Niphona pannosa =

Scientific classification
- Kingdom: Animalia
- Phylum: Arthropoda
- Class: Insecta
- Order: Coleoptera
- Suborder: Polyphaga
- Infraorder: Cucujiformia
- Family: Cerambycidae
- Tribe: Pteropliini
- Genus: Niphona
- Species: N. pannosa

Binomial name
- Niphona pannosa Pascoe, 1862

Synonyms
- Ocheutes scupuliferus Thomson, 1864

Species of beetle

Niphona pannosa is a species of beetle in the family Cerambycidae. It was described by Francis Polkinghorne Pascoe in 1862. It is known from Thailand and Cambodia.
