= Niphona arrogans =

Scientific classification
- Kingdom: Animalia
- Phylum: Arthropoda
- Class: Insecta
- Order: Coleoptera
- Suborder: Polyphaga
- Infraorder: Cucujiformia
- Family: Cerambycidae
- Genus: Niphona
- Species: N. arrogans

Binomial name
- Niphona arrogans Pascoe, 1862

Synonyms
- Aelara arrogans (Pascoe, 1862)

Species of beetle

Niphona arrogans is a species of beetle in the family Cerambycidae. It was described by Francis Polkinghorne Pascoe in 1862. It is known from Borneo, the Philippines and Malaysia.

== Subspecies ==
- Niphona arrogans philippinensis Breuning, 1980
- Niphona arrogans arrogans Pascoe, 1862
