= Niphona fasciculata =

Scientific classification
- Kingdom: Animalia
- Phylum: Arthropoda
- Class: Insecta
- Order: Coleoptera
- Suborder: Polyphaga
- Infraorder: Cucujiformia
- Family: Cerambycidae
- Genus: Niphona
- Species: N. fasciculata

Binomial name
- Niphona fasciculata (Pic, 1917)

Species of beetle

Niphona fasciculata is a species of beetle in the family Cerambycidae. It was described by Maurice Pic in 1917.
