= Niphona fuscatrix =

Scientific classification
- Kingdom: Animalia
- Phylum: Arthropoda
- Clade: Pancrustacea
- Class: Insecta
- Order: Coleoptera
- Suborder: Polyphaga
- Infraorder: Cucujiformia
- Family: Cerambycidae
- Genus: Niphona
- Species: N. fuscatrix

Binomial name
- Niphona fuscatrix (Fabricius, 1792)

Synonyms
- Niphona cylindracea White, 1858; Niphona fuscator (Fabricius, 1792); Niphona fuscatrix m. excavata Breuning, 1962; Ocheutes spinicollis Bates, 1891; Lamia fuscator Fabricius, 1792

Species of beetle

Niphona fuscatrix is a species of beetle in the family Cerambycidae. It was described by Johan Christian Fabricius in 1792. It is known from India.
