= Niphona lunulata =

Scientific classification
- Kingdom: Animalia
- Phylum: Arthropoda
- Class: Insecta
- Order: Coleoptera
- Suborder: Polyphaga
- Infraorder: Cucujiformia
- Family: Cerambycidae
- Genus: Niphona
- Species: N. lunulata

Binomial name
- Niphona lunulata (Pic, 1926)

Species of beetle

Niphona lunulata is a species of beetle in the family Cerambycidae. It was described by Maurice Pic in 1926. It is known from Vietnam and Laos.
