= Niphona parallela =

Scientific classification
- Kingdom: Animalia
- Phylum: Arthropoda
- Class: Insecta
- Order: Coleoptera
- Suborder: Polyphaga
- Infraorder: Cucujiformia
- Family: Cerambycidae
- Tribe: Pteropliini
- Genus: Niphona
- Species: N. parallela

Binomial name
- Niphona parallela White, 1858

Synonyms
- Niphona minor Lameere, 1893; Niphona minuta Pic, 1926

Species of beetle

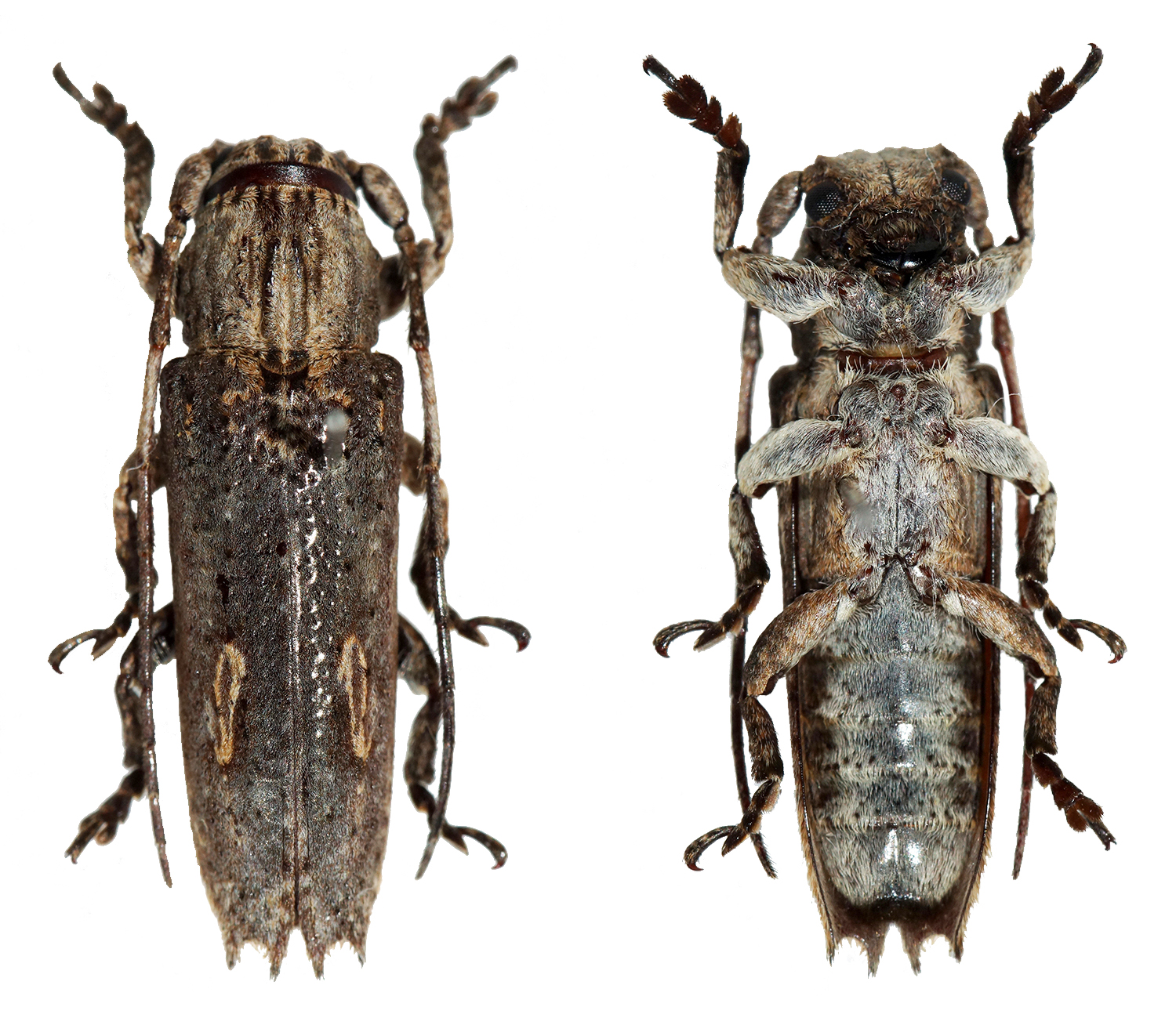

Niphona parallela is a species of beetle in the family Cerambycidae. It was described by White in 1858. It is known from India, China, Myanmar, Cambodia, Malaysia, and Vietnam.
