= Niphona pluricristata =

Scientific classification
- Kingdom: Animalia
- Phylum: Arthropoda
- Class: Insecta
- Order: Coleoptera
- Suborder: Polyphaga
- Infraorder: Cucujiformia
- Family: Cerambycidae
- Tribe: Pteropliini
- Genus: Niphona
- Species: N. pluricristata

Binomial name
- Niphona pluricristata Pesarini & Sabbadini, 1999

Species of beetle

Niphona pluricristata is a species of beetle in the family Cerambycidae. It was described by Pesarini and Sabbadini in 1999.
