= Niphona javana =

Scientific classification
- Kingdom: Animalia
- Phylum: Arthropoda
- Clade: Pancrustacea
- Class: Insecta
- Order: Coleoptera
- Suborder: Polyphaga
- Infraorder: Cucujiformia
- Family: Cerambycidae
- Genus: Niphona
- Species: N. javana

Binomial name
- Niphona javana Franz, 1971

Species of beetle

Niphona javana is a species of beetle in the family Cerambycidae. It was described by Franz in 1971. It is known from Java.
