= Niphona vicina =

Scientific classification
- Kingdom: Animalia
- Phylum: Arthropoda
- Class: Insecta
- Order: Coleoptera
- Suborder: Polyphaga
- Infraorder: Cucujiformia
- Family: Cerambycidae
- Tribe: Pteropliini
- Genus: Niphona
- Species: N. vicina

Binomial name
- Niphona vicina Gahan, 1896

Species of beetle

Niphona vicina is a species of beetle in the family Cerambycidae. It was described by Charles Joseph Gahan in 1896.
