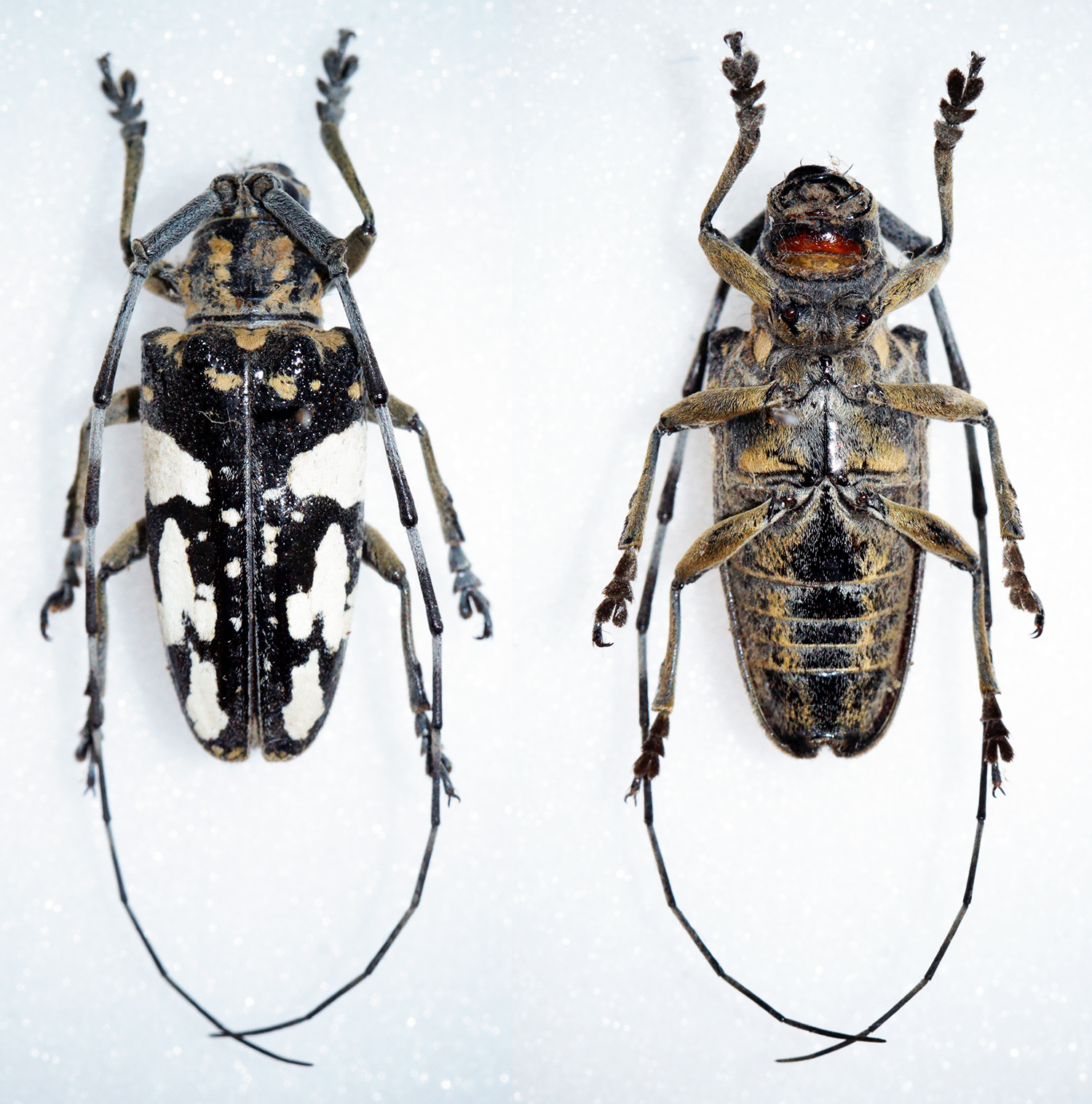

Scientific classification
- Domain: Eukaryota
- Kingdom: Animalia
- Phylum: Arthropoda
- Class: Insecta
- Order: Coleoptera
- Suborder: Polyphaga
- Infraorder: Cucujiformia
- Family: Cerambycidae
- Subfamily: Lamiinae
- Tribe: Monochamini
- Genus: Pharsalia
- Species: P. mortalis

Binomial name
- Pharsalia mortalis (Thomson, 1857)

Synonyms
- Pharsalia albomaculata v. d. Poll, 1887

= Pharsalia mortalis =

Species of beetle

Pharsalia mortalis is a species of beetle in the family Cerambycidae. It was described by James Thomson in 1857.
