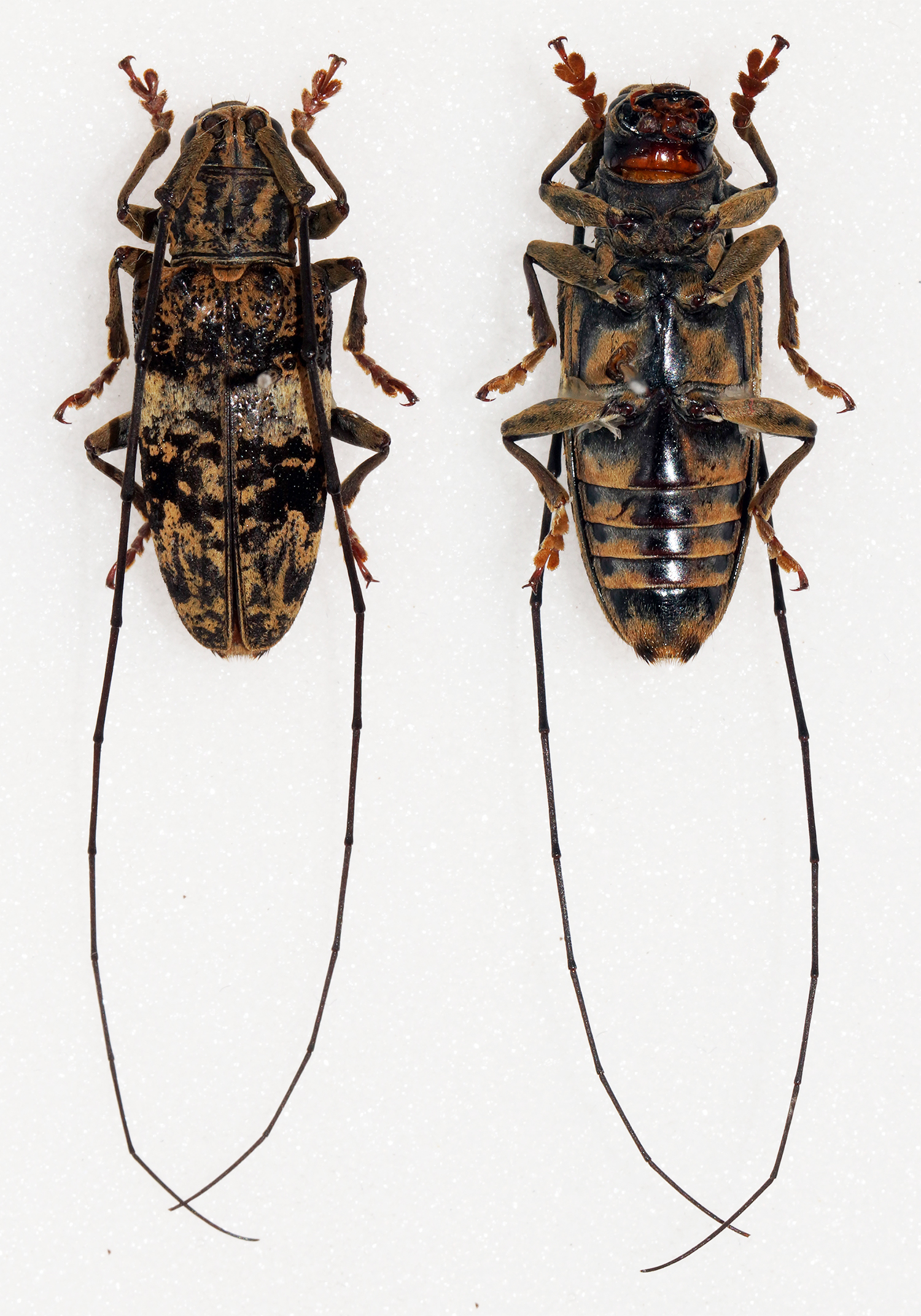

Scientific classification
- Domain: Eukaryota
- Kingdom: Animalia
- Phylum: Arthropoda
- Class: Insecta
- Order: Coleoptera
- Suborder: Polyphaga
- Infraorder: Cucujiformia
- Family: Cerambycidae
- Subfamily: Lamiinae
- Tribe: Monochamini
- Genus: Pharsalia
- Species: P. pulchra

Binomial name
- Pharsalia pulchra Gahan, 1888

Synonyms
- Pharsalia ferruginea Gahan, 1906; Pharsalia nigrofasciata Aurivillius, 1911

= Pharsalia pulchra =

Species of beetle

Pharsalia pulchra is a species of beetle in the family Cerambycidae. It was described by Charles Joseph Gahan in 1888. It is known from Malaysia, Cambodia, China, Thailand, Indonesia, and Vietnam.

== Subspecies ==
- Pharsalia pulchra niasica Aurivillius, 1920
- Pharsalia pulchra pulchra Gahan, 1888
