= Pharsalia patrona =

Scientific classification
- Domain: Eukaryota
- Kingdom: Animalia
- Phylum: Arthropoda
- Class: Insecta
- Order: Coleoptera
- Suborder: Polyphaga
- Infraorder: Cucujiformia
- Family: Cerambycidae
- Subfamily: Lamiinae
- Tribe: Monochamini
- Genus: Pharsalia
- Species: P. patrona

Binomial name
- Pharsalia patrona (Pascoe, 1859)

Species of beetle

Pharsalia patrona is a species of beetle in the family Cerambycidae. It was described by Francis Polkinghorne Pascoe in 1859.
