= Pharsalia truncatipennis =

Scientific classification
- Kingdom: Animalia
- Phylum: Arthropoda
- Clade: Pancrustacea
- Class: Insecta
- Order: Coleoptera
- Suborder: Polyphaga
- Infraorder: Cucujiformia
- Family: Cerambycidae
- Subfamily: Lamiinae
- Tribe: Monochamini
- Genus: Pharsalia
- Species: P. truncatipennis

Binomial name
- Pharsalia truncatipennis Heller, 1915

Species of beetle

Pharsalia truncatipennis is a species of beetle in the family Cerambycidae. It was described by Karl Borromaeus Maria Josef Heller in 1915. It is known from the Philippines.
