= Pharsalia malasiaca =

Scientific classification
- Kingdom: Animalia
- Phylum: Arthropoda
- Clade: Pancrustacea
- Class: Insecta
- Order: Coleoptera
- Suborder: Polyphaga
- Infraorder: Cucujiformia
- Family: Cerambycidae
- Subfamily: Lamiinae
- Tribe: Monochamini
- Genus: Pharsalia
- Species: P. malasiaca

Binomial name
- Pharsalia malasiaca Thomson, 1864

Synonyms
- Pharsalia cincticornis Pascoe, 1866

Species of beetle

Pharsalia malasiaca is a species of beetle in the family Cerambycidae. It was described by James Thomson in 1864. It is known from Sumatra, Borneo and Malaysia.
