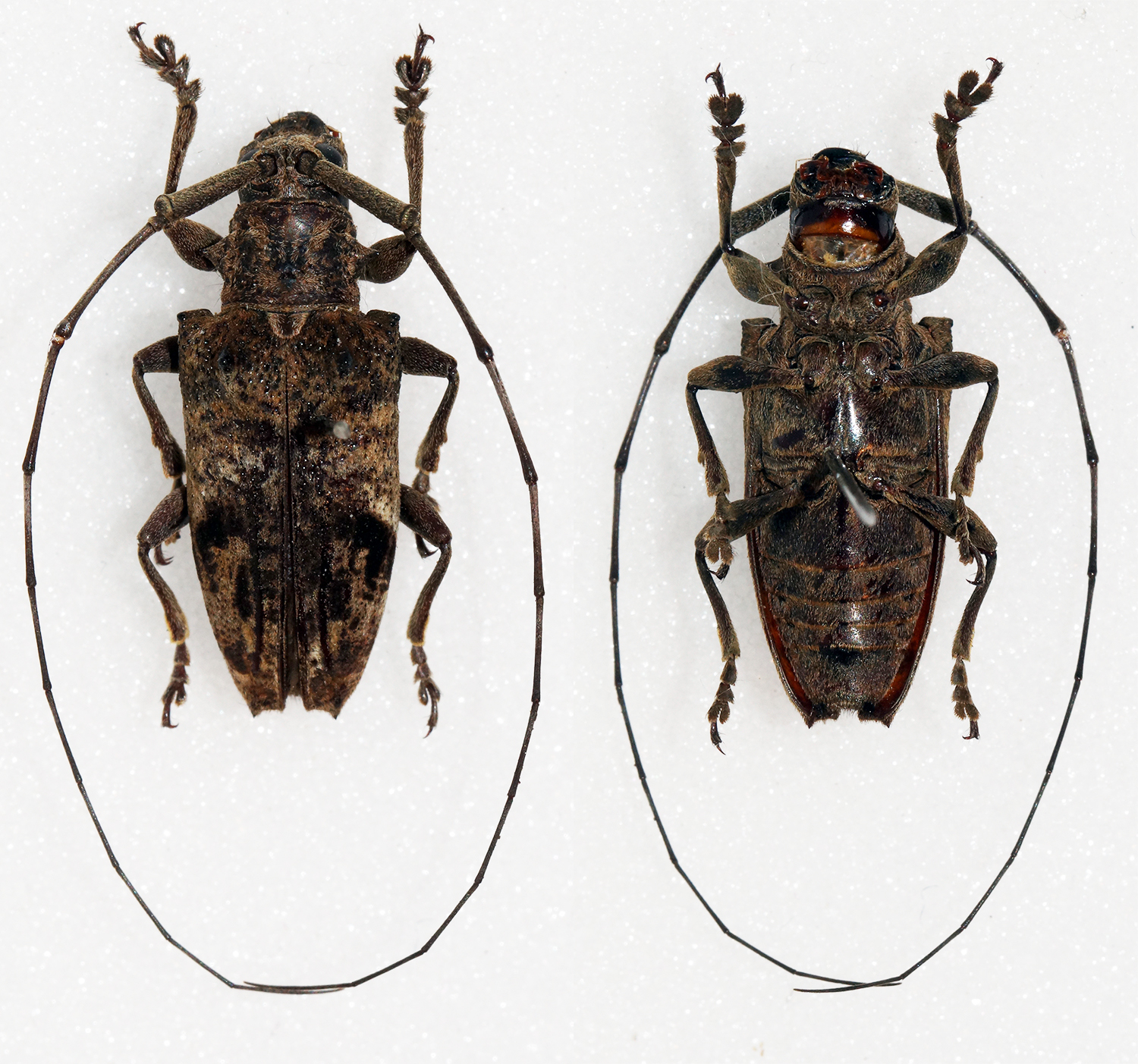

Scientific classification
- Kingdom: Animalia
- Phylum: Arthropoda
- Class: Insecta
- Order: Coleoptera
- Suborder: Polyphaga
- Infraorder: Cucujiformia
- Family: Cerambycidae
- Subfamily: Lamiinae
- Tribe: Monochamini
- Genus: Pharsalia
- Species: P. obliquemaculata

Binomial name
- Pharsalia obliquemaculata Breuning, 1936

Synonyms
- Pharsalia agenor (Newman) Heller, 1913

= Pharsalia obliquemaculata =

Species of beetle

Pharsalia obliquemaculata is a species of beetle in the family Cerambycidae. It was described by Stephan von Breuning in 1936. It is known from the Philippines.
