= Pharsalia gibbifera =

Scientific classification
- Kingdom: Animalia
- Phylum: Arthropoda
- Clade: Pancrustacea
- Class: Insecta
- Order: Coleoptera
- Suborder: Polyphaga
- Infraorder: Cucujiformia
- Family: Cerambycidae
- Subfamily: Lamiinae
- Tribe: Monochamini
- Genus: Pharsalia
- Species: P. gibbifera

Binomial name
- Pharsalia gibbifera (Guérin-Méneville, 1844)

Species of beetle

Pharsalia gibbifera is a species of beetle in the family Cerambycidae. It was described by Félix Édouard Guérin-Méneville in 1844.
