= Pharsalia jaccoudi =

Scientific classification
- Kingdom: Animalia
- Phylum: Arthropoda
- Class: Insecta
- Order: Coleoptera
- Suborder: Polyphaga
- Infraorder: Cucujiformia
- Family: Cerambycidae
- Subfamily: Lamiinae
- Tribe: Monochamini
- Genus: Pharsalia
- Species: P. jaccoudi

Binomial name
- Pharsalia jaccoudi Breuning, 1982

Species of beetle

Pharsalia jaccoudi is a species of beetle in the family Cerambycidae. It was described by Stephan von Breuning in 1982.
