= Pharsalia ochreomaculata =

Scientific classification
- Kingdom: Animalia
- Phylum: Arthropoda
- Class: Insecta
- Order: Coleoptera
- Suborder: Polyphaga
- Infraorder: Cucujiformia
- Family: Cerambycidae
- Subfamily: Lamiinae
- Tribe: Monochamini
- Genus: Pharsalia
- Species: P. ochreomaculata

Binomial name
- Pharsalia ochreomaculata Breuning, 1968

Species of beetle

Pharsalia ochreomaculata is a species of beetle in the family Cerambycidae. It was described by Stephan von Breuning in 1968.
