= Pharsalia proxima =

Scientific classification
- Domain: Eukaryota
- Kingdom: Animalia
- Phylum: Arthropoda
- Class: Insecta
- Order: Coleoptera
- Suborder: Polyphaga
- Infraorder: Cucujiformia
- Family: Cerambycidae
- Subfamily: Lamiinae
- Tribe: Monochamini
- Genus: Pharsalia
- Species: P. proxima

Binomial name
- Pharsalia proxima Gahan, 1890

Species of beetle

Pharsalia proxima is a species of beetle in the family Cerambycidae. It was described by Charles Joseph Gahan in 1890.
