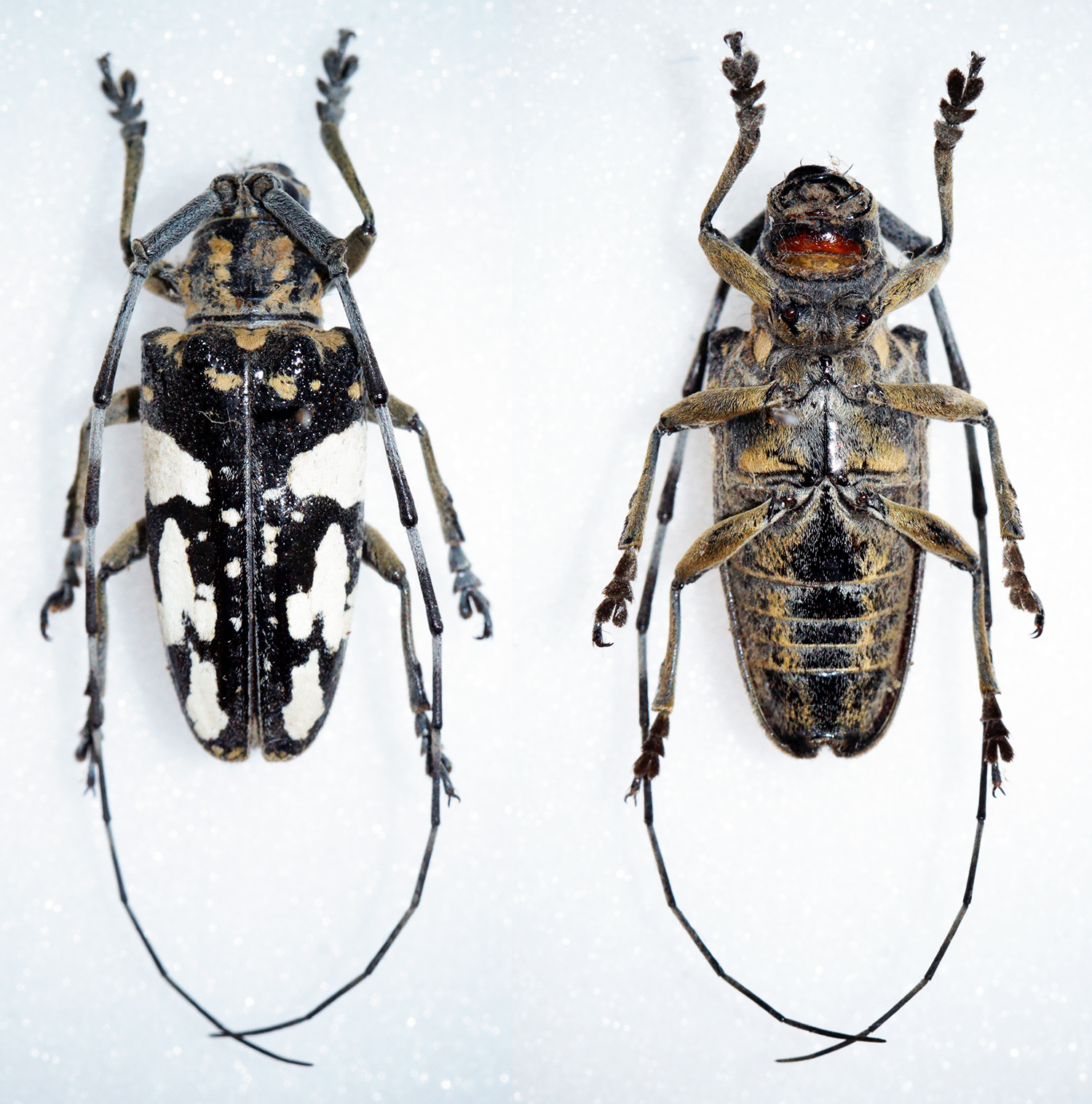
- Pharsalia mortalis

Scientific classification
- Kingdom: Animalia
- Phylum: Arthropoda
- Clade: Pancrustacea
- Class: Insecta
- Order: Coleoptera
- Suborder: Polyphaga
- Infraorder: Cucujiformia
- Family: Cerambycidae
- Subfamily: Lamiinae
- Tribe: Monochamini
- Genus: Pharsalia; Thomson, 1864

Subgenera
- Antennopharsalia Breuning, 1943; Cycos Pascoe, 1866; Eopharsalia Breuning, 1943

Synonyms
- Antennopharsalia Breuning, 1944; Cycos Pascoe, 1866; Eopharsalia de Breuning, 1944

= Pharsalia (beetle) =

Genus of beetles

Pharsalia is a genus of long-horned beetles in the family Cerambycidae. There are at least 40 described species in Pharsalia, found mainly in South and Southeast Asia.

== Species ==
These 40 species belong to the genus Pharsalia:

Subgenus Antennopharsalia Breuning, 1943

- Pharsalia antennata Gahan, 1894
- Pharsalia jaccoudi Breuning, 1982

Subgenus Cycos Pascoe, 1866

- Pharsalia gibbifera (Guérin-Méneville, 1844)
- Pharsalia subgemmata (Thomson, 1857)

Subgenus Eopharsalia Breuning, 1943

- Pharsalia andoi Hayashi, 1975 (Indonesia, Malaysia)
- Pharsalia biplagiata Breuning, 1950 (Indonesia)
- Pharsalia borneensis Breuning, 1936 (Indonesia)
- Pharsalia cameronhighlandica Hayashi, 1975 (Malaysia)
- Pharsalia clara Breuning, 1940 (Indonesia)
- Pharsalia claroides Breuning, 1958 (Indonesia)
- Pharsalia dunni Breuning, 1972 (Malaysia)
- Pharsalia duplicata Pascoe, 1866 (Indonesia, Malaysia, Thailand)
- Pharsalia granulipennis Breuning & de Jong, 1941 (Indonesia)
- Pharsalia implagiata Breuning, 1950 (Malaysia)
- Pharsalia indica Breuning, 1960 (India)
- Pharsalia lentiginosa Pascoe, 1866 (Indonesia, India)
- Pharsalia malasiaca Thomson, 1864 (Indonesia, Malaysia)
- Pharsalia mandli Tippmann, 1955 (China)
- Pharsalia matangensis Breuning, 1958 (Indonesia, Malaysia)
- Pharsalia mortalis (Thomson, 1857) (Indonesia)
- Pharsalia nicobarica Breuning, 1970 (India)
- Pharsalia obliquemaculata Breuning, 1936 (Philippines)
- Pharsalia ochreomaculata Breuning, 1968 (Laos, Vietnam)
- Pharsalia ochreopunctata Fuchs, 1958 (Vietnam)
- Pharsalia ochreostictica Breuning, 1938 (Indonesia)
- Pharsalia patrona (Pascoe, 1859) (Sri Lanka)
- Pharsalia philippinensis Breuning, 1936 (Philippines)
- Pharsalia proxima Gahan, 1890 (India, Sri Lanka)
- Pharsalia pulchra Gahan, 1888 (Southeast Asia)
- Pharsalia pulchroides Breuning, 1965 (Cambodia, Laos, Thailand)
- Pharsalia saperdoides Pascoe, 1866 (Indonesia, Malaysia)
- Pharsalia setulosa Aurivillius, 1920 (Philippines)
- Pharsalia strandi Breuning, 1936 (India)
- Pharsalia supposita Pascoe, 1866 (Indonesia, Malaysia)
- Pharsalia suturalis Aurivillius, 1920 (India)
- Pharsalia thibetana Breuning, 1982 (China)
- Pharsalia tonkinensis Breuning, 1936 (Vietnam)
- Pharsalia trimaculipennis Breuning, 1968 (Laos)
- Pharsalia truncatipennis Heller, 1915 (Philippines)
- Pharsalia variegata Aurivillius, 1920 (India)
