= Pharsalia borneensis =

Scientific classification
- Kingdom: Animalia
- Phylum: Arthropoda
- Class: Insecta
- Order: Coleoptera
- Suborder: Polyphaga
- Infraorder: Cucujiformia
- Family: Cerambycidae
- Subfamily: Lamiinae
- Tribe: Monochamini
- Genus: Pharsalia
- Species: P. borneensis

Binomial name
- Pharsalia borneensis Breuning, 1936

Species of beetle

Pharsalia borneensis is a species of beetle in the family Cerambycidae. It was described by Stephan von Breuning in 1936. It is known from Borneo.
