= Pharsalia suturalis =

Scientific classification
- Domain: Eukaryota
- Kingdom: Animalia
- Phylum: Arthropoda
- Class: Insecta
- Order: Coleoptera
- Suborder: Polyphaga
- Infraorder: Cucujiformia
- Family: Cerambycidae
- Subfamily: Lamiinae
- Tribe: Monochamini
- Genus: Pharsalia
- Species: P. suturalis

Binomial name
- Pharsalia suturalis Aurivillius, 1920

Species of beetle

Pharsalia suturalis is a species of beetle in the family Cerambycidae. It was described by Per Olof Christopher Aurivillius in 1920.
