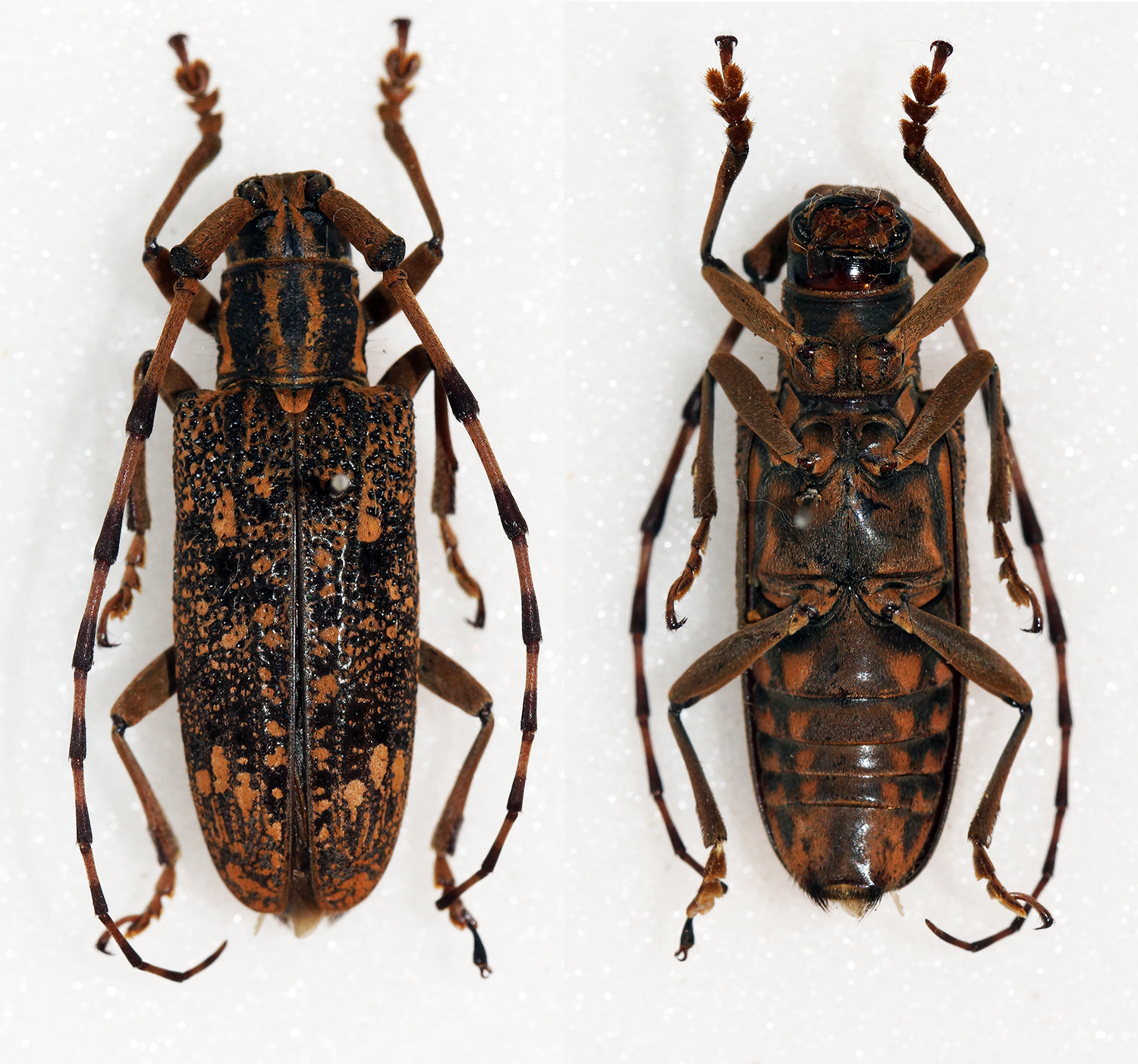

Scientific classification
- Domain: Eukaryota
- Kingdom: Animalia
- Phylum: Arthropoda
- Class: Insecta
- Order: Coleoptera
- Suborder: Polyphaga
- Infraorder: Cucujiformia
- Family: Cerambycidae
- Subfamily: Lamiinae
- Tribe: Monochamini
- Genus: Pharsalia
- Species: P. subgemmata

Binomial name
- Pharsalia subgemmata (Thomson, 1857)

Synonyms
- Anoplophora rondoniana Breuning, 1964; Cycos subgemmatus (Thomson) Lacordaire, 1869; Monohammus georgius White, 1858; Monochamus subgemmatus Thomson, 1857

= Pharsalia subgemmata =

Species of beetle

Pharsalia subgemmata is a species of beetle in the family Cerambycidae. It was described by James Thomson in 1857. It has a wide distribution throughout Asia.
