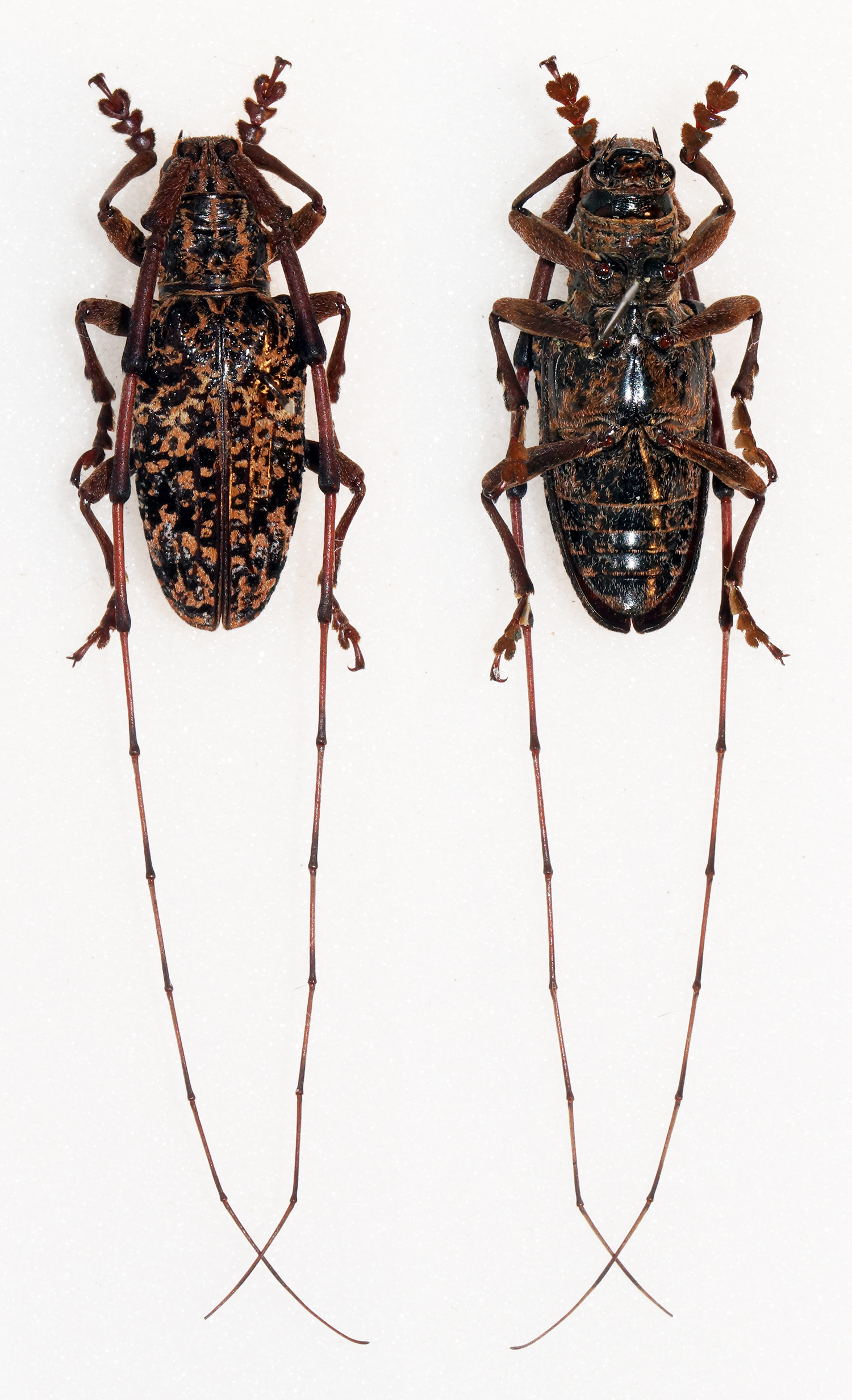

Scientific classification
- Domain: Eukaryota
- Kingdom: Animalia
- Phylum: Arthropoda
- Class: Insecta
- Order: Coleoptera
- Suborder: Polyphaga
- Infraorder: Cucujiformia
- Family: Cerambycidae
- Subfamily: Lamiinae
- Tribe: Monochamini
- Genus: Pharsalia
- Species: P. antennata

Binomial name
- Pharsalia antennata Gahan, 1895

Synonyms
- Pharsalia (Antennopharsalia) rondoni Breuning, 1963; Triammatus tuberculifer Pic, 1903

= Pharsalia antennata =

Species of beetle

Pharsalia antennata is a species of beetle in the family Cerambycidae. It was described by Charles Joseph Gahan in 1895. It is known from India, China, Myanmar, and Laos.
