= Pharsalia ochreopunctata =

Scientific classification
- Domain: Eukaryota
- Kingdom: Animalia
- Phylum: Arthropoda
- Class: Insecta
- Order: Coleoptera
- Suborder: Polyphaga
- Infraorder: Cucujiformia
- Family: Cerambycidae
- Subfamily: Lamiinae
- Tribe: Monochamini
- Genus: Pharsalia
- Species: P. ochreopunctata

Binomial name
- Pharsalia ochreopunctata E. Fuchs, 1957

Species of beetle

Pharsalia ochreopunctata is a species of beetle in the family Cerambycidae. It was described by Ernst Fuchs in 1957.
