= Zotalemimon =

Scientific classification
- Kingdom: Animalia
- Phylum: Arthropoda
- Clade: Pancrustacea
- Class: Insecta
- Order: Coleoptera
- Suborder: Polyphaga
- Infraorder: Cucujiformia
- Family: Cerambycidae
- Tribe: Desmiphorini
- Genus: Zotalemimon

Genus of beetles

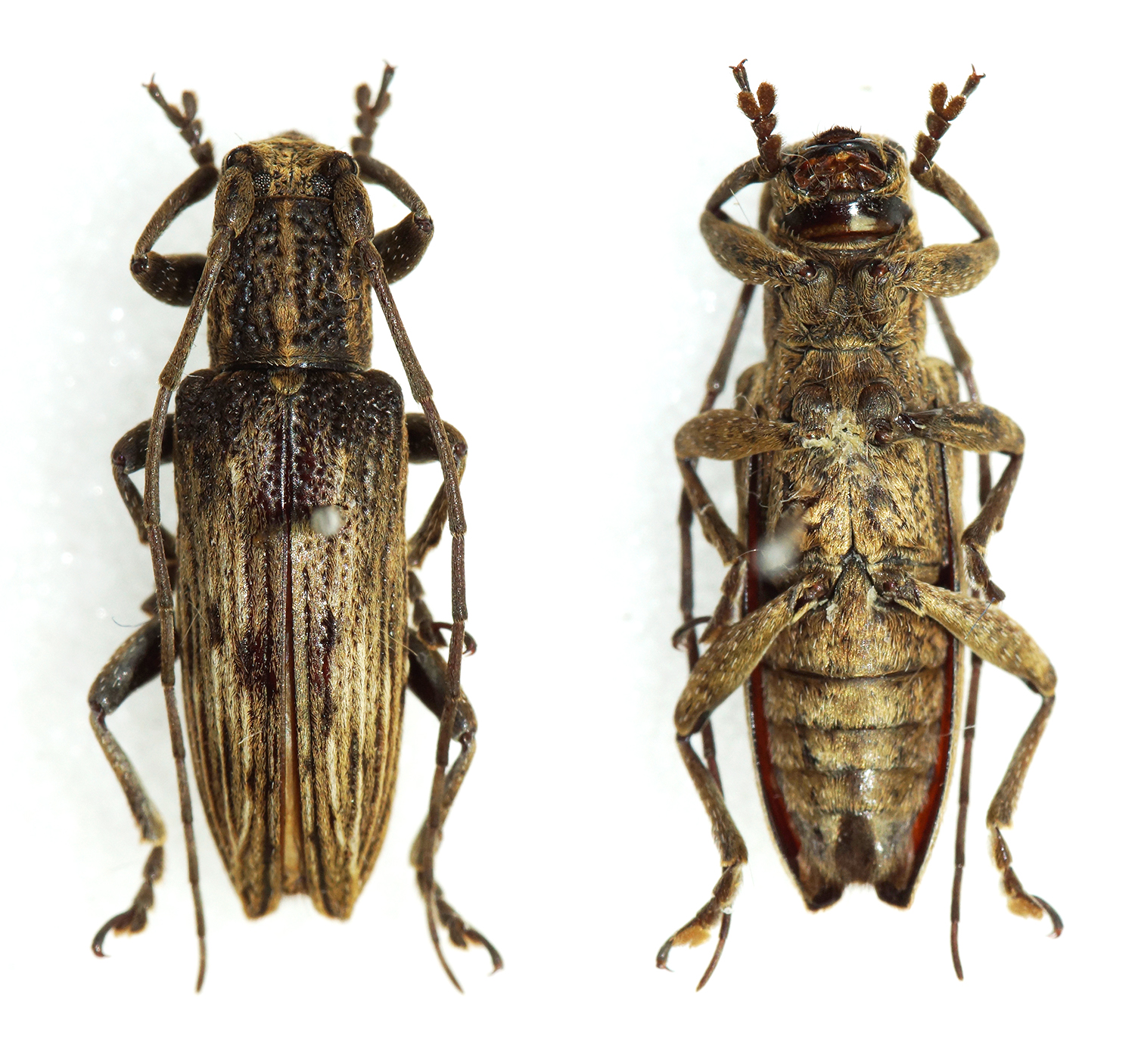
Example of Zotalemimon, specifically Zotalemimon malinum

Zotalemimon is a genus of longhorn beetles of the subfamily Lamiinae, containing the following species:

- Zotalemimon bhutanum (Breuning, 1975)
- Zotalemimon biapicatum (Breuning, 1940)
- Zotalemimon biplagiatum (Breuning, 1940)
- Zotalemimon borneoticum (Breuning, 1969)
- Zotalemimon chapaense (Breuning, 1966)
- Zotalemimon ciliatum (Gressitt, 1942)
- Zotalemimon costatum (Matsushita, 1933)
- Zotalemimon flavolineatum (Breuning, 1975)
- Zotalemimon formosanum (Breuning, 1975)
- Zotalemimon fossulatum (Breuning, 1943)
- Zotalemimon lineatoides (Breuning, 1969)
- Zotalemimon luteonotatum Pic, 1925
- Zotalemimon malinum (Gressitt, 1951)
- Zotalemimon obscurior (Breuning, 1940)
- Zotalemimon posticatum (Gahan, 1894)
- Zotalemimon procerum (Pascoe, 1859)
- Zotalemimon puncticollis (Breuning, 1949)
- Zotalemimon strandi (Breuning, 1940)
- Zotalemimon subglabratum (Gressitt, 1938)
- Zotalemimon subpuncticollis (Breuning, 1975)
- Zotalemimon sybroides (Breuning, 1939)
- Zotalemimon vitalisi (Pic, 1938)
