= Zotalemimon costatum =

Scientific classification
- Domain: Eukaryota
- Kingdom: Animalia
- Phylum: Arthropoda
- Class: Insecta
- Order: Coleoptera
- Suborder: Polyphaga
- Infraorder: Cucujiformia
- Family: Cerambycidae
- Genus: Zotalemimon
- Species: Z. costatum

Binomial name
- Zotalemimon costatum (Matsushita, 1933)

Synonyms
- Diboma costata (Matsushita, 1933); Diboma loochooana Breuning, 1940; Donysia costata (Matsushita) Gressitt, 1940; Sydonia costata Matsushita, 1933

Species of beetle

Zotalemimon costatum is a species of beetle in the family Cerambycidae. It was described by Matsushita in 1933.
