= Zotalemimon subpuncticollis =

Scientific classification
- Kingdom: Animalia
- Phylum: Arthropoda
- Class: Insecta
- Order: Coleoptera
- Suborder: Polyphaga
- Infraorder: Cucujiformia
- Family: Cerambycidae
- Genus: Zotalemimon
- Species: Z. subpuncticollis

Binomial name
- Zotalemimon subpuncticollis (Breuning, 1975)

Synonyms
- Diboma subpuncticollis reuning, 1975

Species of beetle

Zotalemimon subpuncticollis is a species of beetle in the family Cerambycidae. It was described by Stephan von Breuning in 1975.
