= Zotalemimon subglabratum =

Scientific classification
- Domain: Eukaryota
- Kingdom: Animalia
- Phylum: Arthropoda
- Class: Insecta
- Order: Coleoptera
- Suborder: Polyphaga
- Infraorder: Cucujiformia
- Family: Cerambycidae
- Genus: Zotalemimon
- Species: Z. subglabratum

Binomial name
- Zotalemimon subglabratum (Gressitt, 1938)

Synonyms
- Diboma subglabrata (Gressitt, 1938); Sydonia subglabrata Gressitt, 1938

Species of beetle

Zotalemimon subglabratum is a species of beetle in the family Cerambycidae. It was described by Gressitt in 1938, originally under the genus Sydonia.
