= Zotalemimon biapicatum =

Scientific classification
- Kingdom: Animalia
- Phylum: Arthropoda
- Class: Insecta
- Order: Coleoptera
- Suborder: Polyphaga
- Infraorder: Cucujiformia
- Family: Cerambycidae
- Genus: Zotalemimon
- Species: Z. biapicatum

Binomial name
- Zotalemimon biapicatum (Breuning, 1940)

Synonyms
- Diboma biapicata Breuning, 1940

Species of beetle

Zotalemimon biapicatum is a species of beetle in the family Cerambycidae. It was described by Stephan von Breuning in 1940.
