= Zotalemimon fossulatum =

Scientific classification
- Kingdom: Animalia
- Phylum: Arthropoda
- Class: Insecta
- Order: Coleoptera
- Suborder: Polyphaga
- Infraorder: Cucujiformia
- Family: Cerambycidae
- Genus: Zotalemimon
- Species: Z. fossulatum

Binomial name
- Zotalemimon fossulatum (Breuning, 1943)

Synonyms
- Diboma fossulata Breuning, 1943

Species of beetle

Zotalemimon fossulatum is a species of beetle in the family Cerambycidae. It was described by Stephan von Breuning in 1943.
