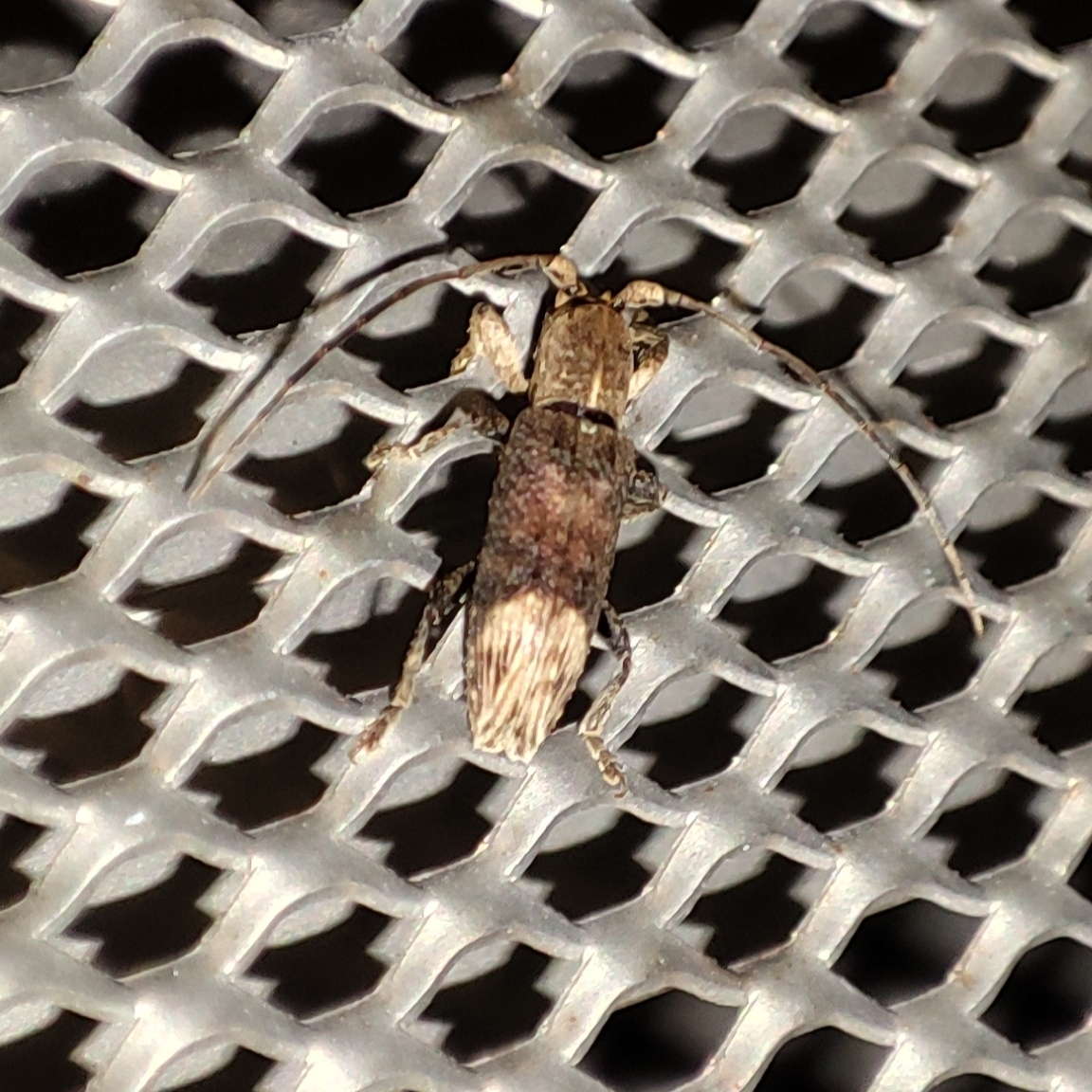

Scientific classification
- Domain: Eukaryota
- Kingdom: Animalia
- Phylum: Arthropoda
- Class: Insecta
- Order: Coleoptera
- Suborder: Polyphaga
- Infraorder: Cucujiformia
- Family: Cerambycidae
- Genus: Zotalemimon
- Species: Z. ciliatum

Binomial name
- Zotalemimon ciliatum (Gressitt, 1942)

Synonyms
- Diboma ciliata Gressitt, 1942

= Zotalemimon ciliatum =

Species of beetle

Zotalemimon ciliatum is a species of beetle in the family Cerambycidae. It was first described by Gressitt in 1942.
