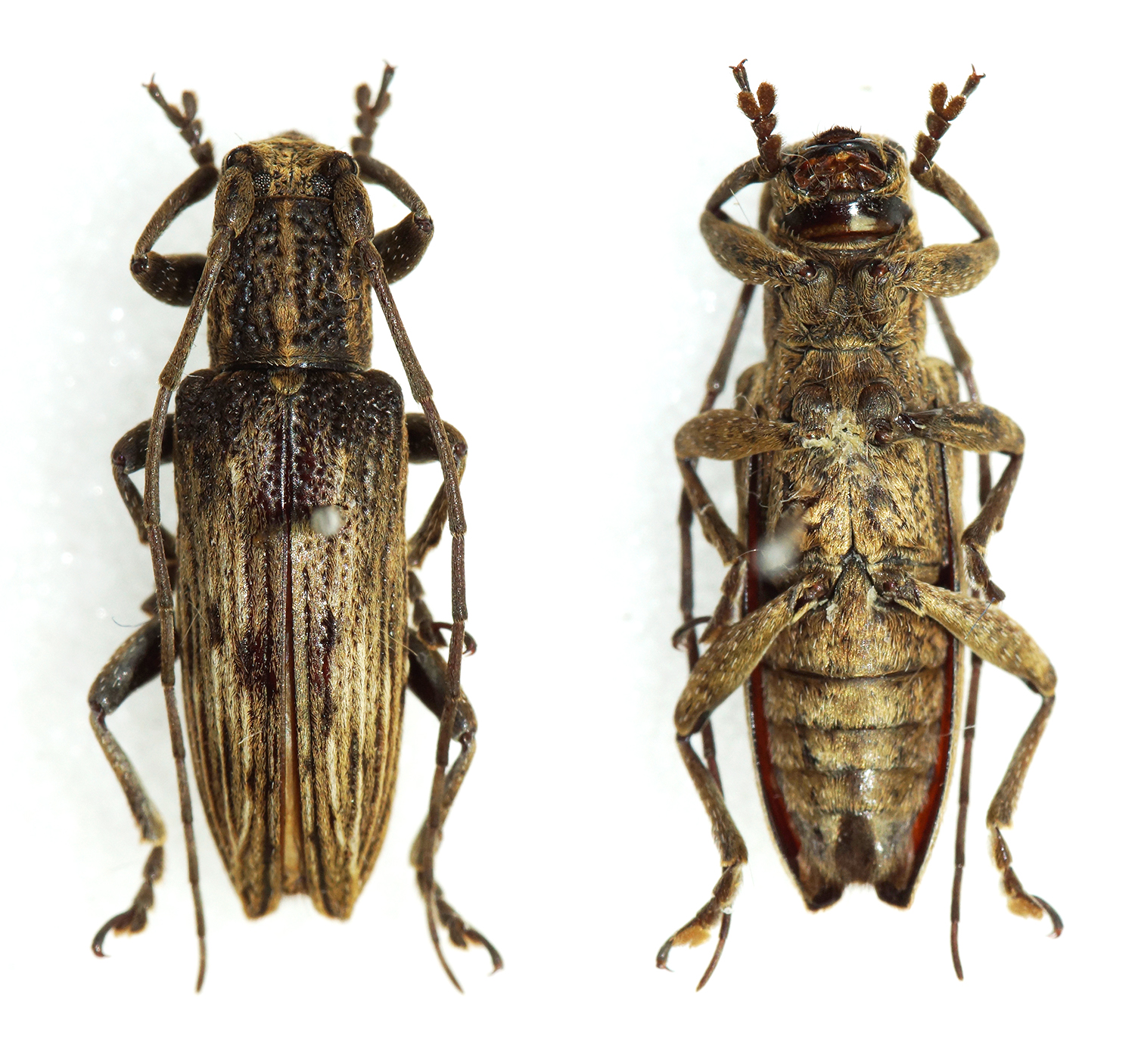

Scientific classification
- Kingdom: Animalia
- Phylum: Arthropoda
- Class: Insecta
- Order: Coleoptera
- Suborder: Polyphaga
- Infraorder: Cucujiformia
- Family: Cerambycidae
- Genus: Zotalemimon
- Species: Z. vitalisi

Binomial name
- Zotalemimon vitalisi (Pic, 1938)

Synonyms
- Diboma vitalisi (Pic, 1938)

= Zotalemimon vitalisi =

Species of beetle

Zotalemimon vitalisi is a species of beetle in the family Cerambycidae. It was described by Maurice Pic in 1938.
