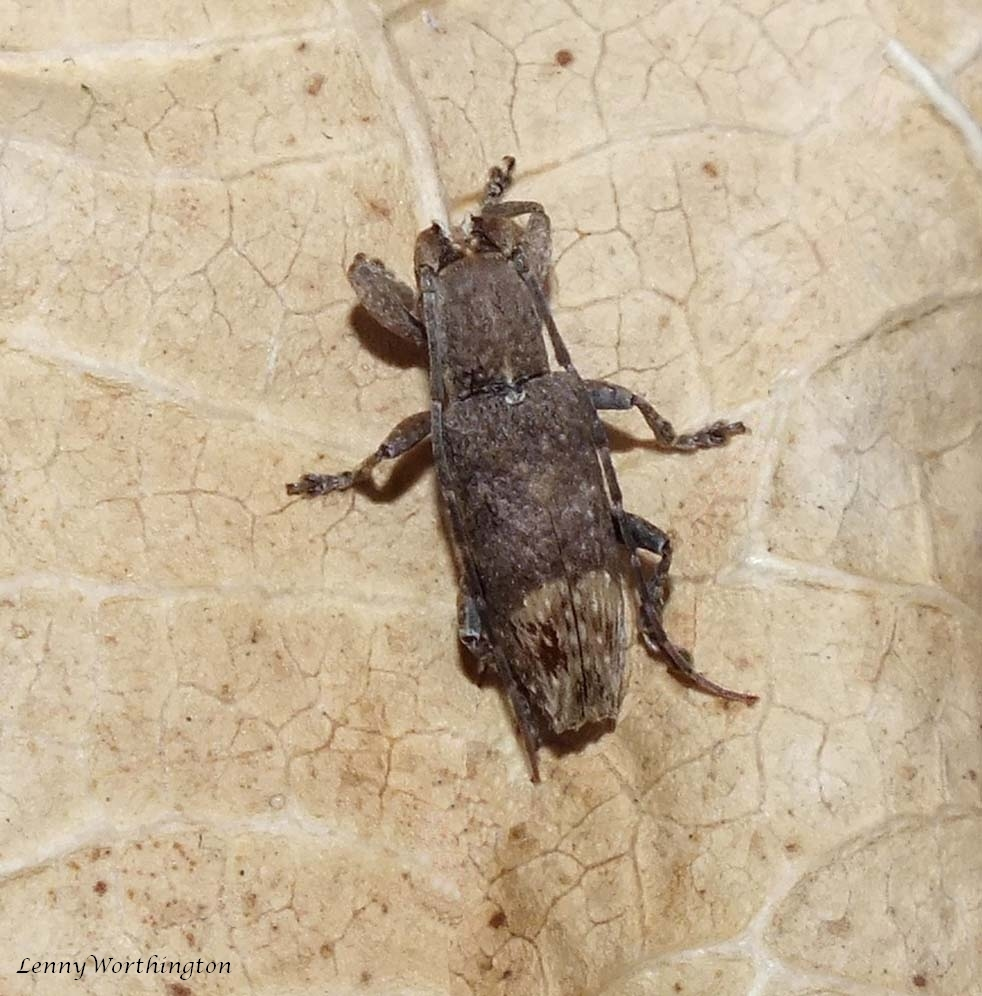

Scientific classification
- Domain: Eukaryota
- Kingdom: Animalia
- Phylum: Arthropoda
- Class: Insecta
- Order: Coleoptera
- Suborder: Polyphaga
- Infraorder: Cucujiformia
- Family: Cerambycidae
- Genus: Zotalemimon
- Species: Z. posticatum

Binomial name
- Zotalemimon posticatum (Gahan, 1894)

Synonyms
- Diboma posticata (Gahan, 1894); Sybra posticata Gahan, 1894; Zotalemimon apicale Pic, 1925

= Zotalemimon posticatum =

Species of beetle

Zotalemimon posticatum is a species of beetle in the family Cerambycidae. It was first described by Gahan in 1894. It is known from Vietnam.
