= Zotalemimon puncticollis =

Scientific classification
- Kingdom: Animalia
- Phylum: Arthropoda
- Class: Insecta
- Order: Coleoptera
- Suborder: Polyphaga
- Infraorder: Cucujiformia
- Family: Cerambycidae
- Genus: Zotalemimon
- Species: Z. puncticollis

Binomial name
- Zotalemimon puncticollis (Breuning, 1949)

Synonyms
- Diboma puncticollis Breuning, 1949

Species of beetle

Zotalemimon puncticollis is a species of beetle in the family Cerambycidae. It was described by Stephan von Breuning in 1949.
