= Zotalemimon lineatoides =

Scientific classification
- Kingdom: Animalia
- Phylum: Arthropoda
- Class: Insecta
- Order: Coleoptera
- Suborder: Polyphaga
- Infraorder: Cucujiformia
- Family: Cerambycidae
- Genus: Zotalemimon
- Species: Z. lineatoides

Binomial name
- Zotalemimon lineatoides (Breuning, 1969)

Synonyms
- Diboma lineatoides Breuning, 1969

Species of beetle

Zotalemimon lineatoides is a species of beetle in the family Cerambycidae. It was described by Stephan von Breuning in 1969.
