= Zotalemimon flavolineatum =

Scientific classification
- Kingdom: Animalia
- Phylum: Arthropoda
- Class: Insecta
- Order: Coleoptera
- Suborder: Polyphaga
- Infraorder: Cucujiformia
- Family: Cerambycidae
- Genus: Zotalemimon
- Species: Z. flavolineatum

Binomial name
- Zotalemimon flavolineatum (Breuning, 1975)

Synonyms
- Diboma flavolineata Breuning, 1975

Species of beetle

Zotalemimon flavolineatum is a species of beetle in the family Cerambycidae. It was described by Stephan von Breuning in 1975.
