= Zotalemimon luteonotatum =

Scientific classification
- Kingdom: Animalia
- Phylum: Arthropoda
- Class: Insecta
- Order: Coleoptera
- Suborder: Polyphaga
- Infraorder: Cucujiformia
- Family: Cerambycidae
- Genus: Zotalemimon
- Species: Z. luteonotatum

Binomial name
- Zotalemimon luteonotatum Pic, 1925

Synonyms
- Diboma luteonotata (Pic, 1924)

Species of beetle

Zotalemimon luteonotatum is a species of beetle in the family Cerambycidae. It was described by Maurice Pic in 1925.
