= Zotalemimon procerum =

Scientific classification
- Domain: Eukaryota
- Kingdom: Animalia
- Phylum: Arthropoda
- Class: Insecta
- Order: Coleoptera
- Suborder: Polyphaga
- Infraorder: Cucujiformia
- Family: Cerambycidae
- Genus: Zotalemimon
- Species: Z. procerum

Binomial name
- Zotalemimon procerum (Pascoe, 1859)

Synonyms
- Diboma procera (Pascoe, 1859); Diboma tranquilla J. Thomson, 1864; Hathlia procera Pascoe, 1859

Species of beetle

Zotalemimon procerum is a species of beetle in the family Cerambycidae. It was described by Francis Polkinghorne Pascoe in 1859. It feeds on the black pepper plant, Piper nigrum.
