= Zotalemimon chapaense =

Scientific classification
- Kingdom: Animalia
- Phylum: Arthropoda
- Class: Insecta
- Order: Coleoptera
- Suborder: Polyphaga
- Infraorder: Cucujiformia
- Family: Cerambycidae
- Genus: Zotalemimon
- Species: Z. chapaense

Binomial name
- Zotalemimon chapaense (Breuning, 1966)

Synonyms
- Diboma chapaensis Breuning, 1966; Zotalemimon chapaensis (Breuning, 1966) (misspelling)

Species of beetle

Zotalemimon chapaense is a species of beetle in the family Cerambycidae. It was described by Stephan von Breuning in 1966. It is known from Vietnam.
