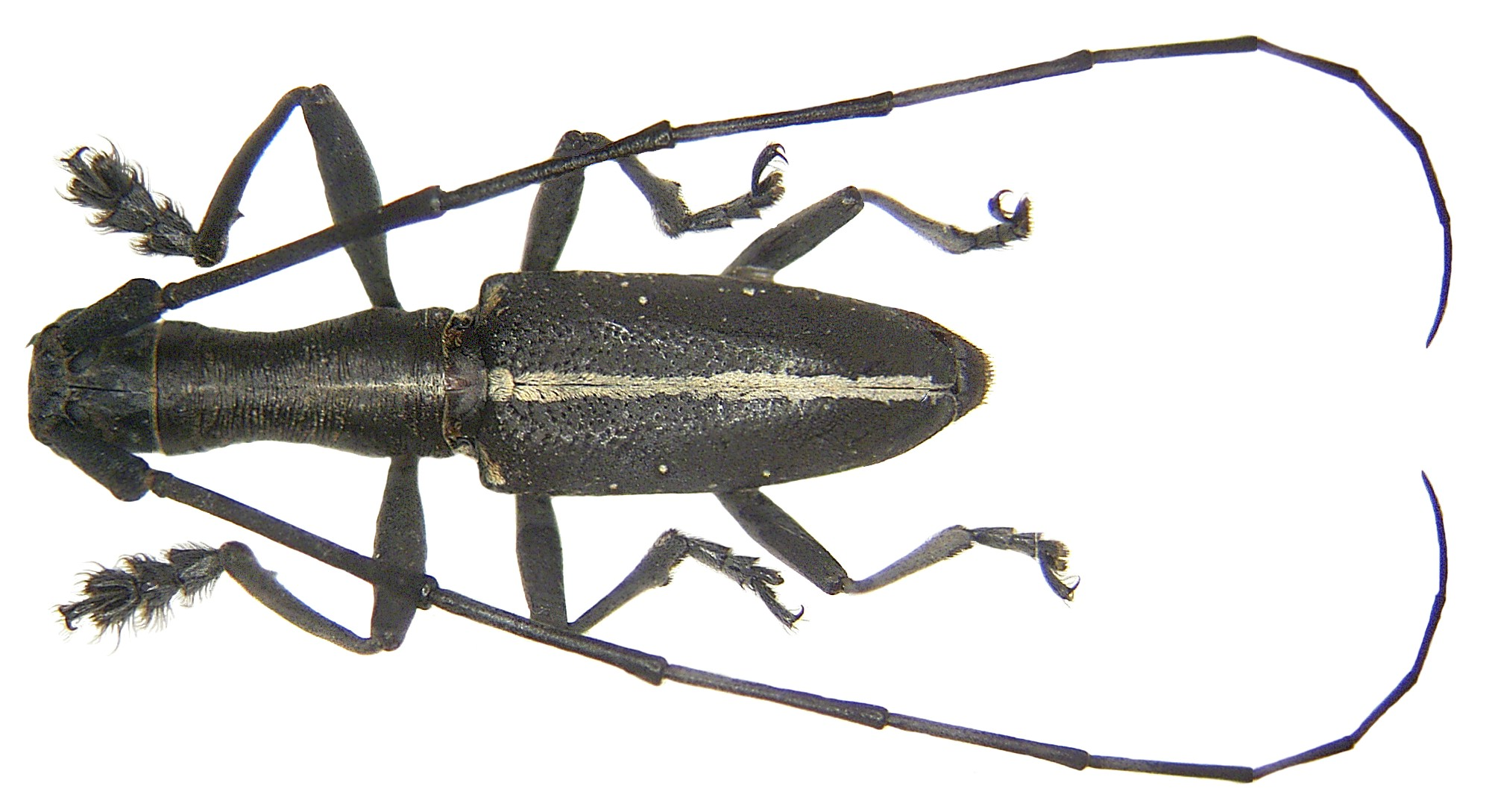

Scientific classification
- Kingdom: Animalia
- Phylum: Arthropoda
- Class: Insecta
- Order: Coleoptera
- Suborder: Polyphaga
- Infraorder: Cucujiformia
- Family: Cerambycidae
- Subfamily: Lamiinae
- Tribe: Gnomini; Thomson, 1864

= Gnomini =

Tribe of beetles

Gnomini is a tribe of longhorn beetles of the subfamily Lamiinae. It was described by Thomson in 1864.

== Taxonomy ==
- Gnoma Fabricius, 1801
- Imantocera Thomson, 1857
- Psectrocera Pascoe, 1862
- Trichognoma Breuning, 1956
