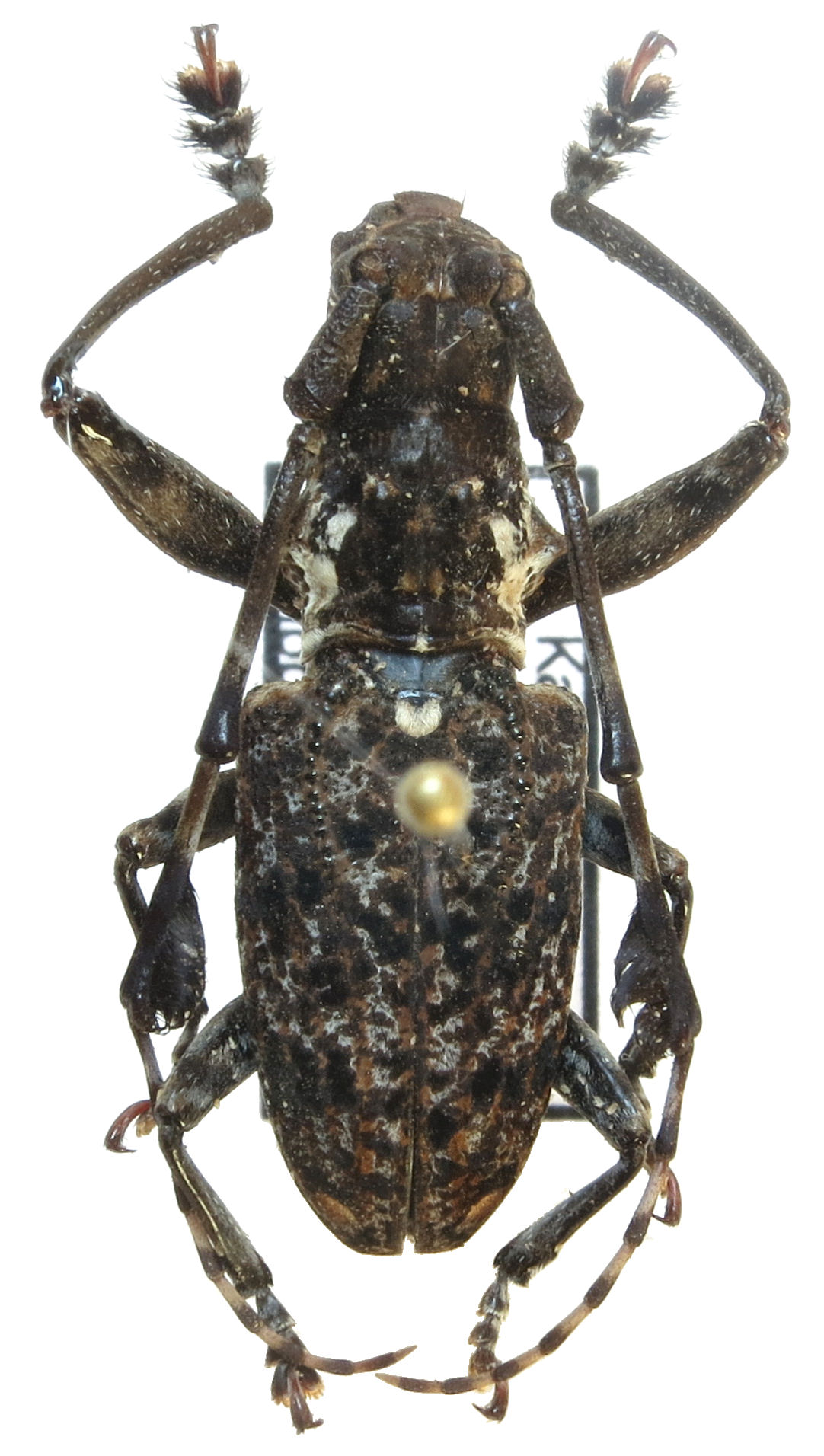
- Imantocera mindanaonis male - Kapatagan, Lanao del Sur, Philippines

Scientific classification
- Kingdom: Animalia
- Phylum: Arthropoda
- Class: Insecta
- Order: Coleoptera
- Suborder: Polyphaga
- Infraorder: Cucujiformia
- Family: Cerambycidae
- Genus: Imantocera
- Species: I. mindanaonis

Binomial name
- Imantocera mindanaonis Breuning, 1980

= Imantocera mindanaonis =

Species of beetle

Imantocera mindanaonis is a species of beetle in the family Cerambycidae. It was described by Stephan von Breuning in 1980. It is known from the Philippines.
