= Imantocera grisescens =

Scientific classification
- Kingdom: Animalia
- Phylum: Arthropoda
- Clade: Pancrustacea
- Class: Insecta
- Order: Coleoptera
- Suborder: Polyphaga
- Infraorder: Cucujiformia
- Family: Cerambycidae
- Genus: Imantocera
- Species: I. grisescens

Binomial name
- Imantocera grisescens Dillon & Dillon, 1951

Species of beetle

Imantocera grisescens is a species of beetle in the family Cerambycidae. It was described by Dillon and Dillon in 1951. It is known from Java.
