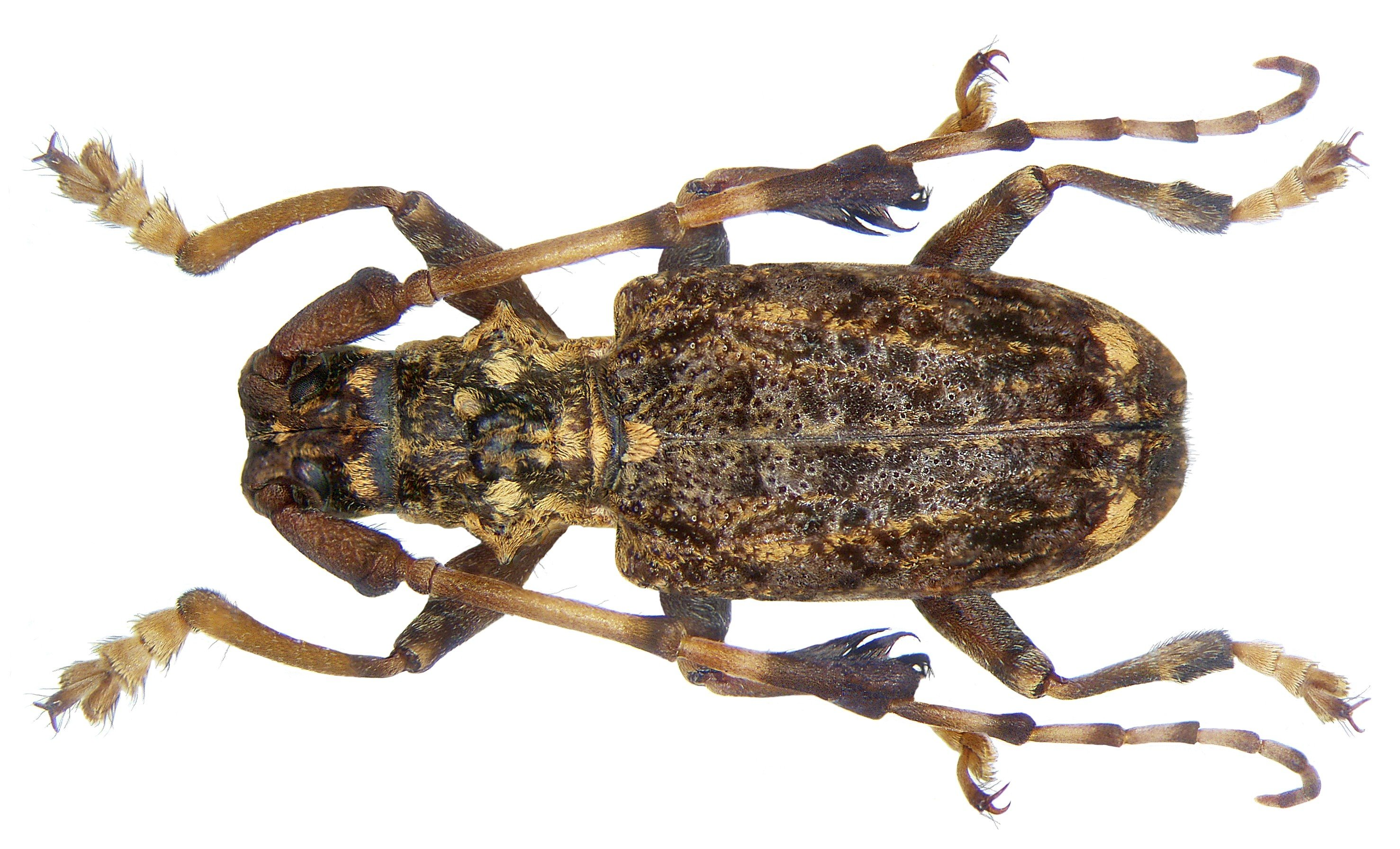

Scientific classification
- Kingdom: Animalia
- Phylum: Arthropoda
- Class: Insecta
- Order: Coleoptera
- Suborder: Polyphaga
- Infraorder: Cucujiformia
- Family: Cerambycidae
- Genus: Imantocera
- Species: I. penicillata

Binomial name
- Imantocera penicillata (Hope, 1831)

Synonyms
- Lamia penicillata Hope, 1831

= Imantocera penicillata =

Species of beetle

Imantocera penicillata is a species of beetle in the family Cerambycidae. It was described by Hope in 1831, originally under the genus Lamia. It is known from Bangladesh, Bhutan, India, Myanmar, China, Thailand, Laos, Nepal, and Vietnam.
