= Imantocera niasensis =

Scientific classification
- Kingdom: Animalia
- Phylum: Arthropoda
- Class: Insecta
- Order: Coleoptera
- Suborder: Polyphaga
- Infraorder: Cucujiformia
- Family: Cerambycidae
- Genus: Imantocera
- Species: I. niasensis

Binomial name
- Imantocera niasensis Breuning, 1936

Species of beetle

Imantocera niasensis is a species of beetle in the family Cerambycidae. It was described by Stephan von Breuning in 1936. It is known from Sumatra.
