= Imantocera arenosa =

Scientific classification
- Kingdom: Animalia
- Phylum: Arthropoda
- Class: Insecta
- Order: Coleoptera
- Suborder: Polyphaga
- Infraorder: Cucujiformia
- Family: Cerambycidae
- Genus: Imantocera
- Species: I. arenosa

Binomial name
- Imantocera arenosa Pascoe, 1862

Synonyms
- Imantocera olivieri Thomson, 1865

Species of beetle

Imantocera arenosa is a species of beetle in the family Cerambycidae. It was described by Francis Polkinghorne Pascoe in 1862. It is known from Cambodia and Thailand.
