= Imantocera vicina =

Scientific classification
- Kingdom: Animalia
- Phylum: Arthropoda
- Class: Insecta
- Order: Coleoptera
- Suborder: Polyphaga
- Infraorder: Cucujiformia
- Family: Cerambycidae
- Genus: Imantocera
- Species: I. vicina

Binomial name
- Imantocera vicina Gahan, 1895

Species of beetle

Imantocera vicina is a species of beetle in the family Cerambycidae. It was described by Charles Joseph Gahan in 1895. It is known from India and Myanmar.
