= Imantocera plumosa =

Scientific classification
- Kingdom: Animalia
- Phylum: Arthropoda
- Clade: Pancrustacea
- Class: Insecta
- Order: Coleoptera
- Suborder: Polyphaga
- Infraorder: Cucujiformia
- Family: Cerambycidae
- Genus: Imantocera
- Species: I. plumosa

Binomial name
- Imantocera plumosa (Olivier, 1792)

Synonyms
- Imantocera acmoceroides J. Thomson, 1865; Imantocera borneotica Breuning, 1940; Cerambyx plumosus Olivier, 1792

Species of beetle

Imantocera plumosa is a species of beetle in the family Cerambycidae. It was described by Guillaume-Antoine Olivier in 1792, originally under the genus Cerambyx. It is known from Java, Borneo, Malaysia, and Sumatra.
