= Imantocera sumbawana =

Scientific classification
- Kingdom: Animalia
- Phylum: Arthropoda
- Class: Insecta
- Order: Coleoptera
- Suborder: Polyphaga
- Infraorder: Cucujiformia
- Family: Cerambycidae
- Genus: Imantocera
- Species: I. sumbawana

Binomial name
- Imantocera sumbawana Breuning, 1947

Species of beetle

Imantocera sumbawana is a species of beetle in the family Cerambycidae. It was described by Stephan von Breuning in 1947. It is known from Indonesia.
