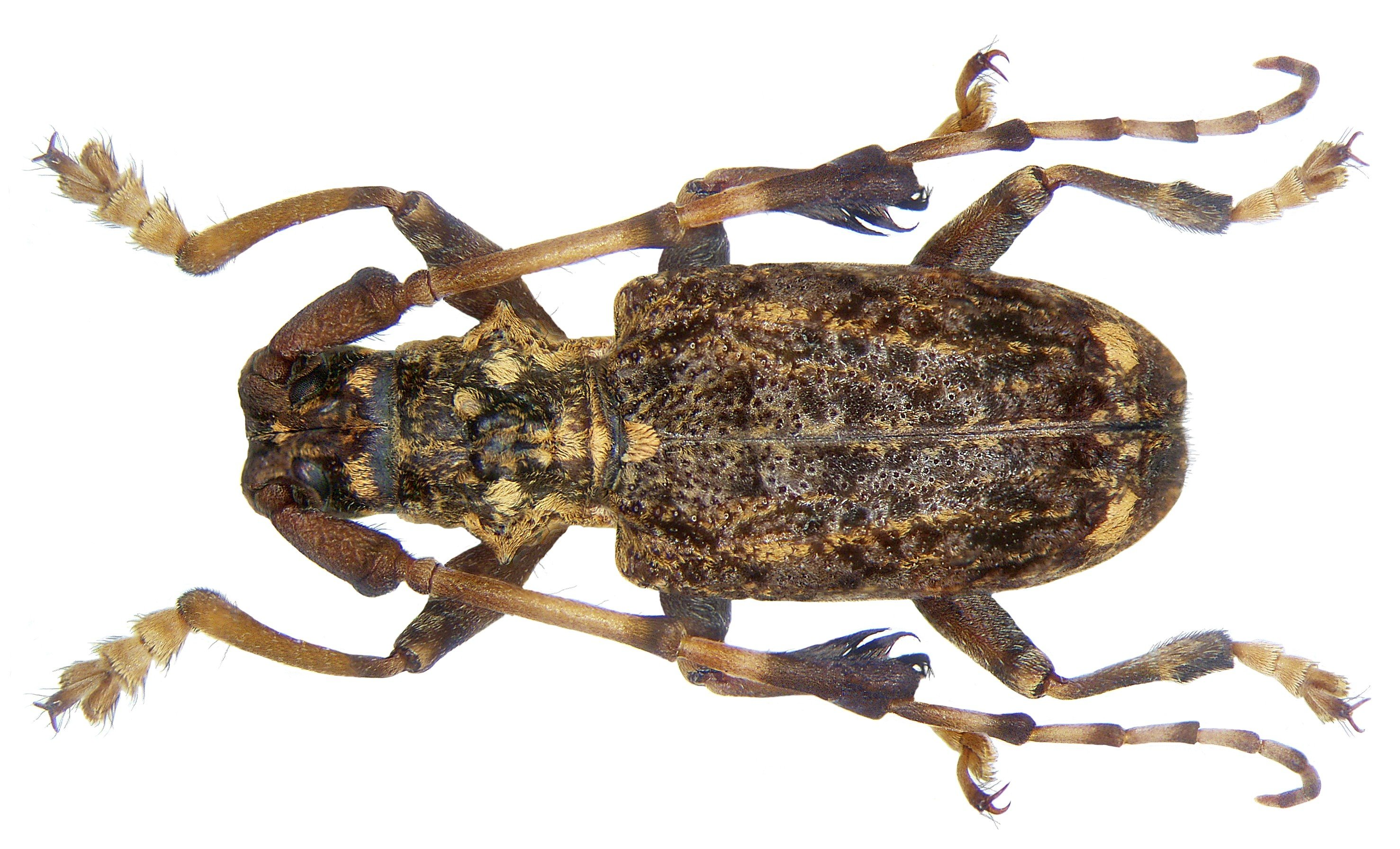
- Imantocera penicillata

Scientific classification
- Kingdom: Animalia
- Phylum: Arthropoda
- Class: Insecta
- Order: Coleoptera
- Suborder: Polyphaga
- Infraorder: Cucujiformia
- Family: Cerambycidae
- Tribe: Gnomini
- Genus: Imantocera; Dejean, 1835

Type species
- Cerambyx plumosus Olivier, 1792

= Imantocera =

Genus of beetles

Imantocera is a genus of longhorn beetles of the subfamily Lamiinae, containing the following species:

- Imantocera arenosa Pascoe, 1862
- Imantocera grisescens Dillon & Dillon, 1951
- Imantocera mindanaonis Breuning, 1980
- Imantocera niasensis Breuning, 1936
- Imantocera penicillata (Hope, 1831)
- Imantocera plumosa (Olivier, 1792)
- Imantocera sumbawana Breuning, 1947
- Imantocera vicina Gahan, 1895
