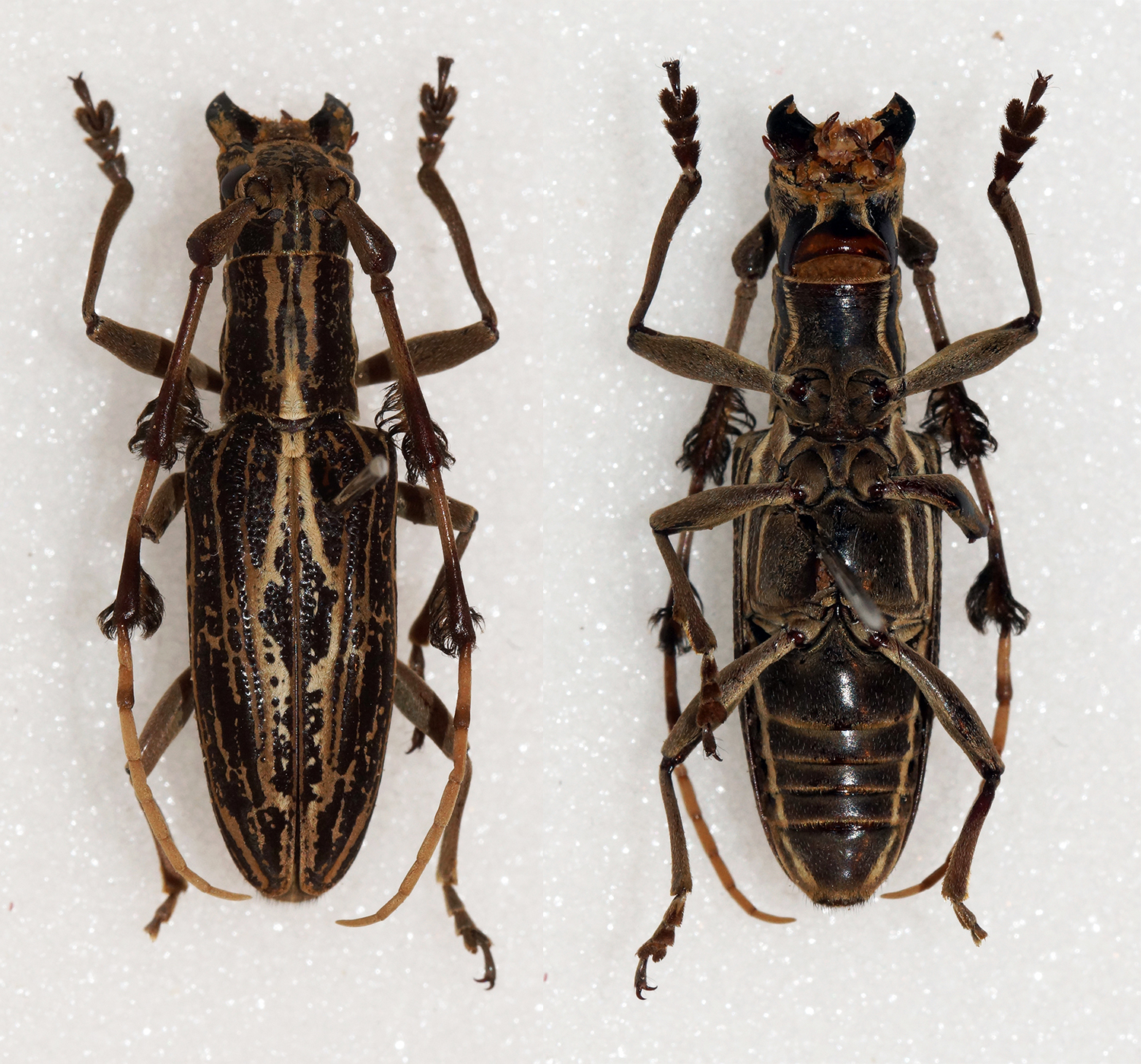

Scientific classification
- Kingdom: Animalia
- Phylum: Arthropoda
- Class: Insecta
- Order: Coleoptera
- Suborder: Polyphaga
- Infraorder: Cucujiformia
- Family: Cerambycidae
- Genus: Psectrocera
- Species: P. plumigera

Binomial name
- Psectrocera plumigera (Westwood, 1848)

= Psectrocera =

Genus of beetles

Psectrocera plumigera is a species of beetle that is part of the family Cerambycidae, and the only species in the genus Psectrocera. It was described by John O. Westwood in 1848.
