= Trichognoma =

Scientific classification
- Kingdom: Animalia
- Phylum: Arthropoda
- Class: Insecta
- Order: Coleoptera
- Suborder: Adephaga
- Family: Carabidae
- Genus: Trichognoma
- Species: T. chinensis

Binomial name
- Trichognoma chinensis Breuning, 1956

Genus of beetles

Trichognoma chinensis is a species of beetle in the family Cerambycidae, and the only species in the genus Trichognoma. It was described by Stephan von Breuning in 1956.
