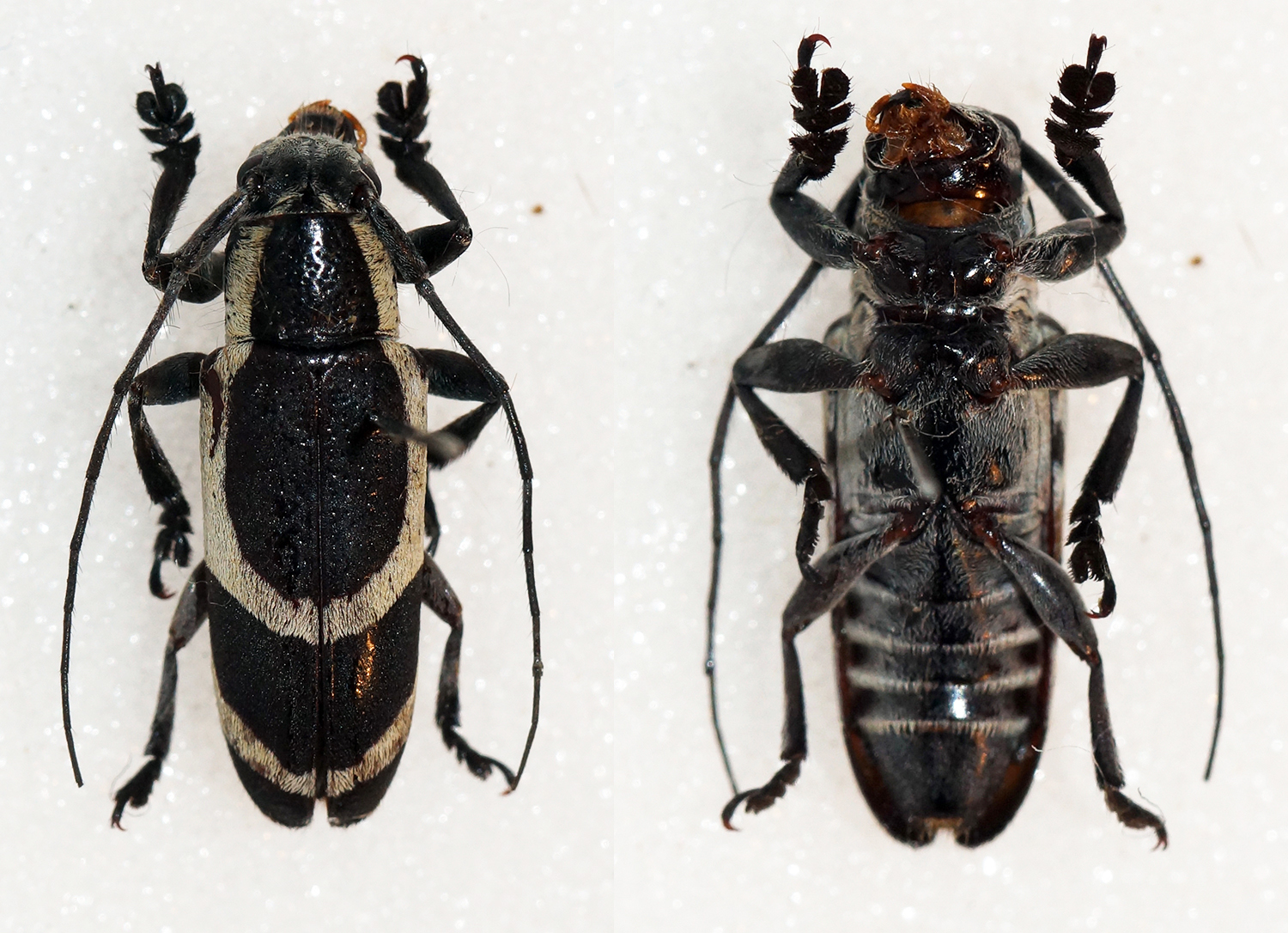

Scientific classification
- Kingdom: Animalia
- Phylum: Arthropoda
- Class: Insecta
- Order: Coleoptera
- Suborder: Polyphaga
- Infraorder: Cucujiformia
- Family: Cerambycidae
- Genus: Demodes
- Species: D. frenata

Binomial name
- Demodes frenata (Pascoe, 1857)

Synonyms
- Apomecyna frenata Pascoe, 1857; Athmodes schoenherri Thomson, 1865; Phemone frenata (Pascoe, 1857)

= Demodes frenata =

Species of beetle

Demodes frenata is a species of beetle in the family Cerambycidae. It was described by Francis Polkinghorne Pascoe in 1857, originally under the genus Apomecyna. It is known from Singapore, Malaysia, and Sumatra.
