= Demodes immunda =

Scientific classification
- Kingdom: Animalia
- Phylum: Arthropoda
- Class: Insecta
- Order: Coleoptera
- Suborder: Polyphaga
- Infraorder: Cucujiformia
- Family: Cerambycidae
- Genus: Demodes
- Species: D. immunda

Binomial name
- Demodes immunda Newman, 1842

Species of beetle

Demodes immunda is a species of beetle in the family Cerambycidae. It was described by Newman in 1842.
