= Apomecyna varia =

Scientific classification
- Kingdom: Animalia
- Phylum: Arthropoda
- Class: Insecta
- Order: Coleoptera
- Suborder: Polyphaga
- Infraorder: Cucujiformia
- Family: Cerambycidae
- Genus: Apomecyna
- Species: A. varia

Binomial name
- Apomecyna varia Blanchard in Gay, 1851

Synonyms
- Apomezyna varia (Blanchard, 1851)

Species of beetles

Apomecyna varia is a species of beetle in the family Cerambycidae. It was described by Émile Blanchard in 1851. It is known from Chile.

Adults measure 13–13.5 mm (0.51–0.53 in) in length.
