= Demodes siporensis =

Scientific classification
- Kingdom: Animalia
- Phylum: Arthropoda
- Class: Insecta
- Order: Coleoptera
- Suborder: Polyphaga
- Infraorder: Cucujiformia
- Family: Cerambycidae
- Genus: Demodes
- Species: D. siporensis

Binomial name
- Demodes siporensis Breuning, 1939

Species of beetle

Demodes siporensis is a species of beetle in the family Cerambycidae. It was described by Stephan von Breuning in 1939.
