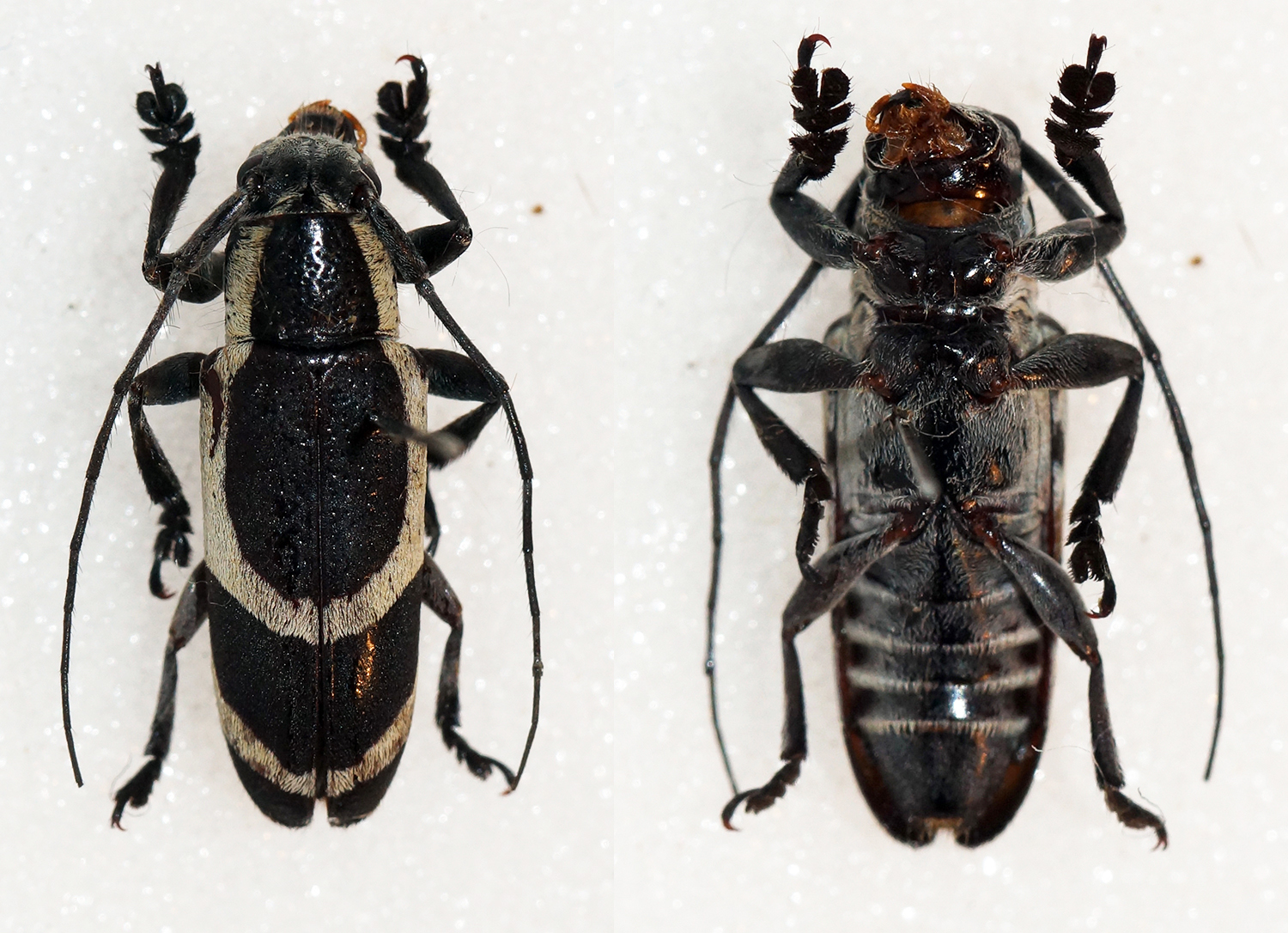
- Demodes frenata

Scientific classification
- Kingdom: Animalia
- Phylum: Arthropoda
- Class: Insecta
- Order: Coleoptera
- Suborder: Polyphaga
- Infraorder: Cucujiformia
- Family: Cerambycidae
- Tribe: Mesosini
- Genus: Demodes

= Demodes =

Genus of beetles

Demodes is a genus of longhorn beetles of the subfamily Lamiinae, containing the following species:

- Demodes albomaculata Breuning, 1939
- Demodes bimaculata Breuning, 1947
- Demodes conspersa (Aurivillius, 1914)
- Demodes frenata (Pascoe, 1857)
- Demodes immunda Newman, 1842
- Demodes javanica Breuning, 1950
- Demodes malaccensis (Breuning, 1935)
- Demodes mindanaonis Breuning, 1939
- Demodes siporensis Breuning, 1939
- Demodes subconspersa Breuning, 1950
- Demodes vittata Gahan, 1906
