= Demodes albomaculata =

Scientific classification
- Kingdom: Animalia
- Phylum: Arthropoda
- Class: Insecta
- Order: Coleoptera
- Suborder: Polyphaga
- Infraorder: Cucujiformia
- Family: Cerambycidae
- Genus: Demodes
- Species: D. albomaculata

Binomial name
- Demodes albomaculata Breuning, 1939

Species of beetle

Demodes albomaculata is a species of beetle in the family Cerambycidae. It was described by Stephan von Breuning in 1939. It is known from Sumatra.
