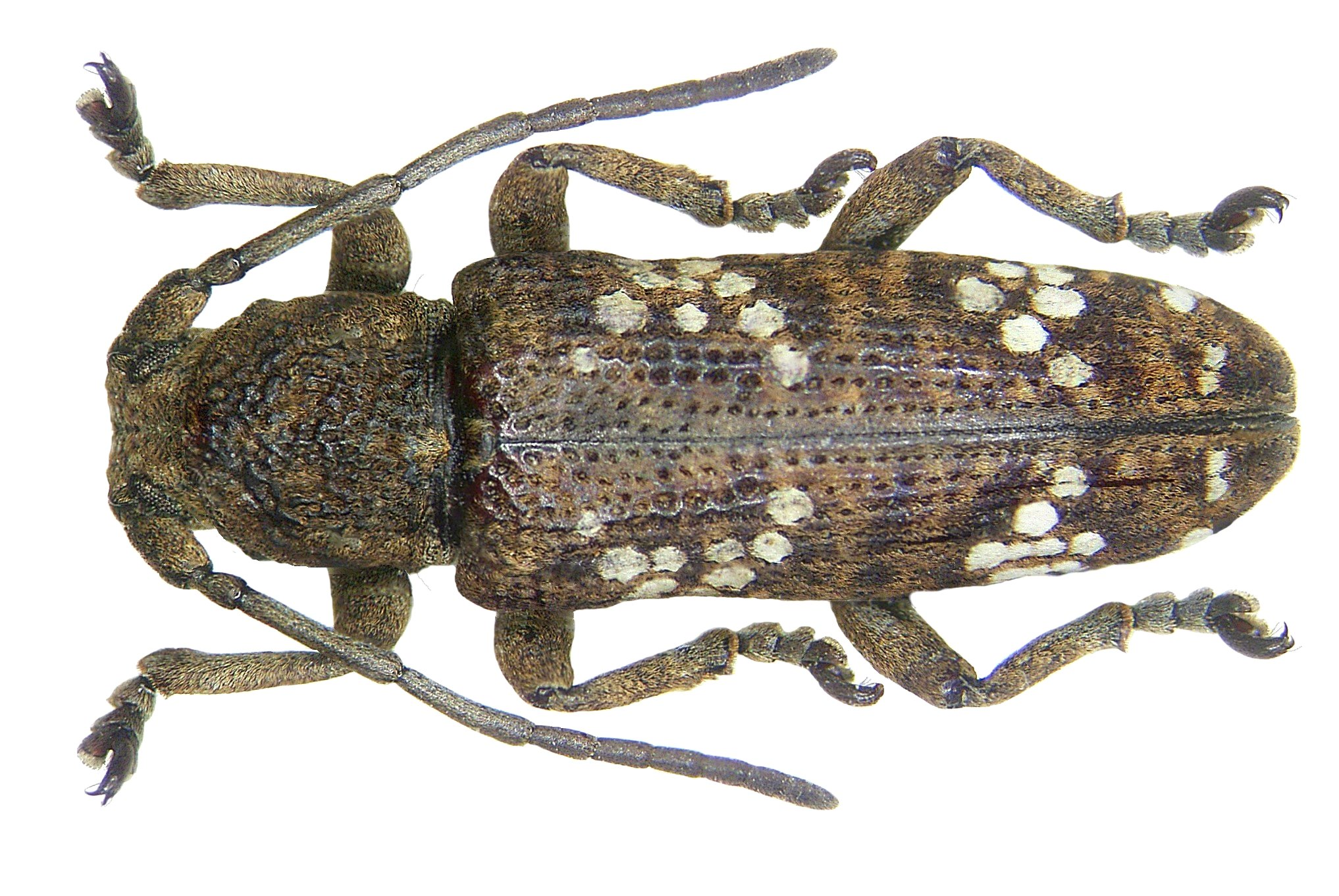
- Apomecyna saltator

Scientific classification
- Domain: Eukaryota
- Kingdom: Animalia
- Phylum: Arthropoda
- Class: Insecta
- Order: Coleoptera
- Suborder: Polyphaga
- Infraorder: Cucujiformia
- Family: Cerambycidae
- Tribe: Apomecynini
- Genus: Apomecyna; Audinet-Serville, 1835

Type species
- Lamia histrio Fabricius, 1792

Synonyms
- Mecynapus Thomson, 1858; Pseudalbana Pic, 1895; Anapomecyna Pic. 1925; Parapomecyna Breuning, 1968

= Apomecyna =

Genus of beetles

Apomecyna is a genus of beetle in the family Cerambycidae, containing over 80 species worldwide, primarily in the Old World. Many species use plants in the family Cucurbitaceae as hosts.

Beetles in this genus are cylindrical and elongate with thick antennae that are shorter than the body. The antennae have the third segment as long or longer than the fourth and much longer than the first. The fifth and subsequent antennal segments are short. The eye is emarginate with the ventral lobe running transverse. Underneath the body, there is a narrow prosternal process while the mesosternal process slopes towards the apex.

== Species ==
- Apomecyna acutipennis Kolbe, 1893
- Apomecyna adspersaria Breuning, 1942
- Apomecyna alboannulata Breuning, 1938
- Apomecyna albovaria Breuning, 1954
- Apomecyna angolensis Breuning, 1950
- Apomecyna atomaria Pascoe, 1858
- Apomecyna binubila Pascoe, 1858
- Apomecyna bisignata Breuning, 1952
- Apomecyna bivittata Breuning, 1938
- Apomecyna bizonata Breuning, 1969
- Apomecyna bremeri Breuning, 1982
- Apomecyna brunnea Hintz, 1919
- Apomecyna cavifrons Thomson, 1868
- Apomecyna ceylonica Breuning, 1938
- Apomecyna cochinchinensis Breuning, 1982
- Apomecyna collarti Breuning, 1948
- Apomecyna corrugata Breuning, 1938
- Apomecyna cretacea (Hope, 1831)
- Apomecyna curticornis Breuning, 1960
- Apomecyna densemaculata Breuning, 1938
- Apomecyna endroedyi Breuning, 1972
- Apomecyna excavata Breuning, 1938
- Apomecyna excavatipennis Breuning, 1969
- Apomecyna fallaciosa Breuning, 1938
- Apomecyna flavoguttulata Aurivillius, 1916
- Apomecyna flavomarmorata Breuning, 1938
- Apomecyna flavovittata Chiang, 1963
- Apomecyna gracillima (Breuning, 1938)
- Apomecyna hauseri Breuning, 1960
- Apomecyna histrio (Fabricius, 1793)
- Apomecyna holorufipennis Breuning, 1977
- Apomecyna kochi Breuning, 1962
- Apomecyna lameerei (Pic, 1895)
- Apomecyna latefasciata Quedenfeldt, 1885
- Apomecyna leleupi Breuning, 1960
- Apomecyna leucosticta (Hope, 1831)
- Apomecyna longicollis Pic, 1925
- Apomecyna longipennis Thomson, 1858
- Apomecyna luteomaculata (Pic, 1925)
- Apomecyna luzonica Breuning, 1938
- Apomecyna mindanaonis Breuning, 1980
- Apomecyna minima Breuning, 1938
- Apomecyna naevia Bates, 1873
- Apomecyna nigritarsis Gahan, 1900
- Apomecyna nigroapicalis Aurivillius, 1907
- Apomecyna nimbae Lepesme & Breuning, 1952
- Apomecyna obliquata Klug, 1833
- Apomecyna obliquevitticollis Breuning, 1968
- Apomecyna papuana Breuning, 1943
- Apomecyna paraguttifera Breuning, 1977
- Apomecyna parisii (Breuning, 1940)
- Apomecyna parumguttata Breuning, 1938
- Apomecyna parumpunctata Chevrolat, 1856
- Apomecyna porphyrea Montrouzier, 1855
- Apomecyna proxima Breuning, 1938
- Apomecyna quadrisignata Quedenfeldt, 1885
- Apomecyna quadristicta Kolbe, 1894
- Apomecyna reducta Breuning, 1939
- Apomecyna rufipennis Pic, 1935
- Apomecyna rufomarmorata Breuning, 1973
- Apomecyna salomonum Breuning, 1938
- Apomecyna saltator (Fabricius, 1787)
- Apomecyna sarasinorum Heller, 1916
- Apomecyna scalaris Audinet-Serville, 1835
- Apomecyna scorteccii Breuning, 1968
- Apomecyna semihistrio Kusama & Takakuwa, 1984
- Apomecyna somaliensis Breuning, 1948
- Apomecyna stramentosa Breuning, 1938
- Apomecyna subcavifrons Breuning, 1954
- Apomecyna tigrina Thomson, 1857
- Apomecyna trifasciata Quedenfeldt, 1883
- Apomecyna triseriata Aurivillius, 1907
- Apomecyna usambarica Breuning, 1961
- Apomecyna vaneyeni Breuning, 1952
- Apomecyna varia Blanchard, 1851
- Apomecyna vitticollis Breuning, 1939
