= Pseudocalamobius okinawanus =

Scientific classification
- Domain: Eukaryota
- Kingdom: Animalia
- Phylum: Arthropoda
- Class: Insecta
- Order: Coleoptera
- Suborder: Polyphaga
- Infraorder: Cucujiformia
- Family: Cerambycidae
- Genus: Pseudocalamobius
- Species: P. okinawanus

Binomial name
- Pseudocalamobius okinawanus Samuelson, 1965

Species of beetle

Pseudocalamobius okinawanus is a species of beetle in the family Cerambycidae. It was described by Samuelson in 1965.
