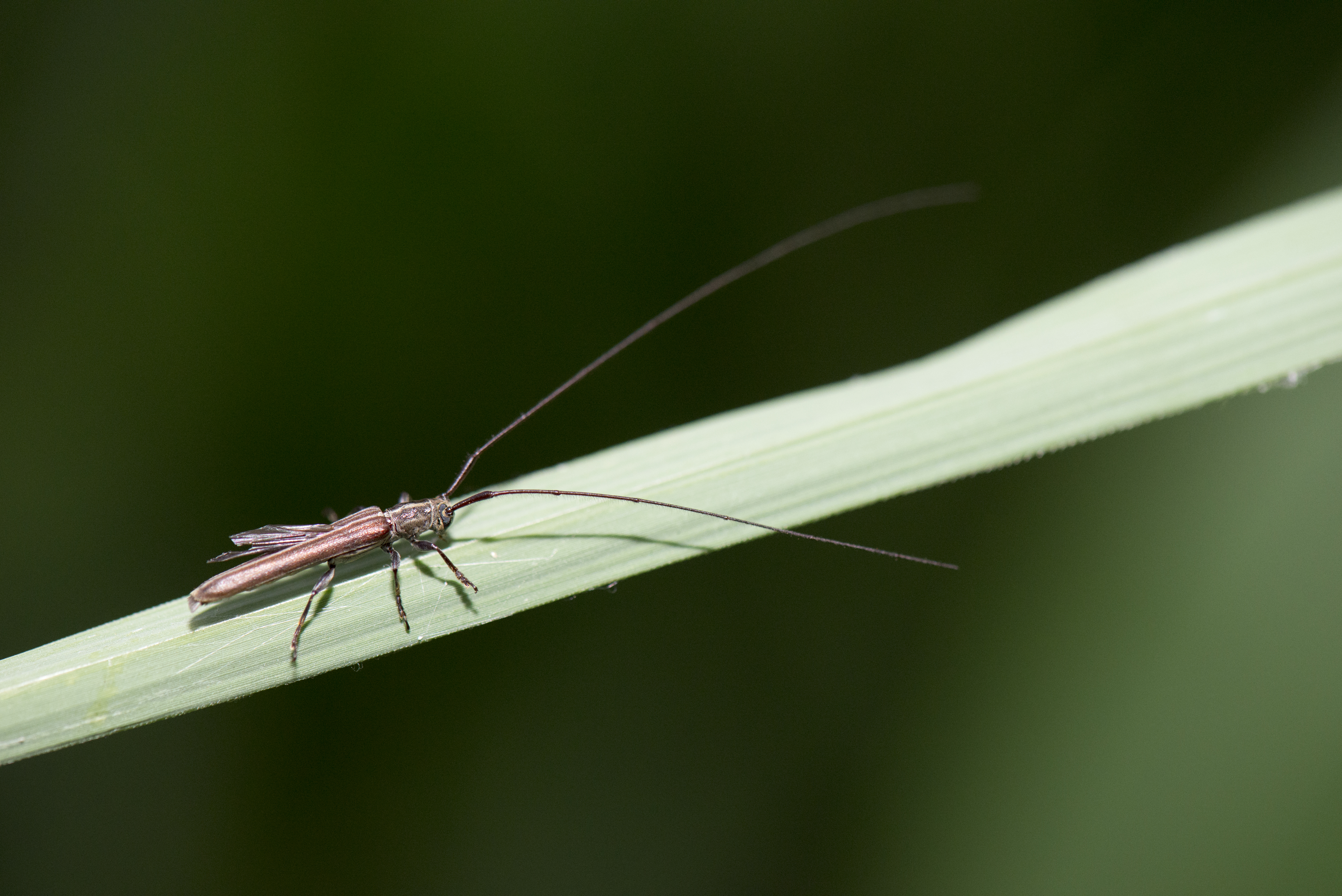

Scientific classification
- Domain: Eukaryota
- Kingdom: Animalia
- Phylum: Arthropoda
- Class: Insecta
- Order: Coleoptera
- Suborder: Polyphaga
- Infraorder: Cucujiformia
- Family: Cerambycidae
- Genus: Pseudocalamobius
- Species: P. taiwanensis

Binomial name
- Pseudocalamobius taiwanensis Matsushita, 1931

= Pseudocalamobius taiwanensis =

Species of beetle

Pseudocalamobius taiwanensis is a species of beetle in the family Cerambycidae. It was described by Matsushita in 1931.
