= Pseudocalamobius piceus =

Scientific classification
- Domain: Eukaryota
- Kingdom: Animalia
- Phylum: Arthropoda
- Class: Insecta
- Order: Coleoptera
- Suborder: Polyphaga
- Infraorder: Cucujiformia
- Family: Cerambycidae
- Genus: Pseudocalamobius
- Species: P. piceus

Binomial name
- Pseudocalamobius piceus Gressitt, 1951

Species of beetle

Pseudocalamobius piceus is a species of beetle in the family Cerambycidae. It was described by Gressitt in 1951.
