= Pseudocalamobius filiformis =

Scientific classification
- Kingdom: Animalia
- Phylum: Arthropoda
- Class: Insecta
- Order: Coleoptera
- Suborder: Polyphaga
- Infraorder: Cucujiformia
- Family: Cerambycidae
- Genus: Pseudocalamobius
- Species: P. filiformis

Binomial name
- Pseudocalamobius filiformis Fairmaire, 1888

Species of beetle

Pseudocalamobius filiformis is a species of beetle in the family Cerambycidae. It was described by Fairmaire in 1888.
