= Pseudocalamobius =

Scientific classification
- Kingdom: Animalia
- Phylum: Arthropoda
- Class: Insecta
- Order: Coleoptera
- Suborder: Polyphaga
- Infraorder: Cucujiformia
- Family: Cerambycidae
- Subfamily: Lamiinae
- Tribe: Agapanthiini
- Genus: Pseudocalamobius; Kraatz, 1879

Genus of beetles

Pseudocalamobius is a genus of beetles in the family Cerambycidae, containing the following species:

- Pseudocalamobius bhutanensis Breuning, 1975
- Pseudocalamobius bispinosus Breuning, 1940
- Pseudocalamobius burmanensis Breuning, 1949
- Pseudocalamobius ceylonensis Breuning, 1940
- Pseudocalamobius discolineatus Pic, 1927
- Pseudocalamobius diversus Breuning, 1948
- Pseudocalamobius filiformis Fairmaire, 1888
- Pseudocalamobius flavolineatus Breuning, 1940
- Pseudocalamobius incertus Breuning, 1940
- Pseudocalamobius japonicus (Bates, 1873)
- Pseudocalamobius javanicus Breuning, 1948
- Pseudocalamobius leptissimus Gressitt, 1936
- Pseudocalamobius lobatus Breuning, 1940
- Pseudocalamobius luteonotatus Pic, 1908
- Pseudocalamobius montanus Hayashi, 1959
- Pseudocalamobius niisatoi Hasegawa, 1987
- Pseudocalamobius obscuriscapus Breuning, 1975
- Pseudocalamobius okinawanus Samuelson, 1965
- Pseudocalamobius piceus Gressitt, 1951
- Pseudocalamobius proximus Breuning, 1940
- Pseudocalamobius pubescens Hasegawa, 1987
- Pseudocalamobius rondoni Breuning, 1964
- Pseudocalamobius rufescens Breuning, 1940
- Pseudocalamobius seriemaculatus Breuning, 1940
- Pseudocalamobius strandi Breuning, 1940
- Pseudocalamobius szetschuanicus Breuning, 1947
- Pseudocalamobius taiwanensis Matsushita, 1931
- Pseudocalamobius talianus Pic, 1916
- Pseudocalamobius truncatus Breuning, 1940
- Pseudocalamobius tsushimae Breuning, 1961
- Pseudocalamobius yunnanus Breuning, 1942
