= Pseudocalamobius montanus =

Scientific classification
- Kingdom: Animalia
- Phylum: Arthropoda
- Class: Insecta
- Order: Coleoptera
- Suborder: Polyphaga
- Infraorder: Cucujiformia
- Family: Cerambycidae
- Genus: Pseudocalamobius
- Species: P. montanus

Binomial name
- Pseudocalamobius montanus Hayashi, 1959

Species of beetle

Pseudocalamobius montanus is a species of beetle in the family Cerambycidae. It was described by Hayashi in 1959.
