= Pseudocalamobius pubescens =

Scientific classification
- Domain: Eukaryota
- Kingdom: Animalia
- Phylum: Arthropoda
- Class: Insecta
- Order: Coleoptera
- Suborder: Polyphaga
- Infraorder: Cucujiformia
- Family: Cerambycidae
- Genus: Pseudocalamobius
- Species: P. pubescens

Binomial name
- Pseudocalamobius pubescens Hasegawa, 1987

Species of beetle

Pseudocalamobius pubescens is a species of beetle in the family Cerambycidae. It was described by Hasegawa in 1987.
