= Pseudocalamobius luteonotatus =

Scientific classification
- Kingdom: Animalia
- Phylum: Arthropoda
- Class: Insecta
- Order: Coleoptera
- Suborder: Polyphaga
- Infraorder: Cucujiformia
- Family: Cerambycidae
- Genus: Pseudocalamobius
- Species: P. luteonotatus

Binomial name
- Pseudocalamobius luteonotatus Pic, 1908

Species of beetle

Pseudocalamobius luteonotatus is a species of beetle in the family Cerambycidae. It was described by Maurice Pic in 1908.
