= Pseudocalamobius leptissimus =

Scientific classification
- Domain: Eukaryota
- Kingdom: Animalia
- Phylum: Arthropoda
- Class: Insecta
- Order: Coleoptera
- Suborder: Polyphaga
- Infraorder: Cucujiformia
- Family: Cerambycidae
- Genus: Pseudocalamobius
- Species: P. leptissimus

Binomial name
- Pseudocalamobius leptissimus Gressitt, 1936

Species of beetle

Pseudocalamobius leptissimus is a species of beetle in the family Cerambycidae. It was described by Gressitt in 1936.
