= Desisa takasagoana =

Scientific classification
- Domain: Eukaryota
- Kingdom: Animalia
- Phylum: Arthropoda
- Class: Insecta
- Order: Coleoptera
- Suborder: Polyphaga
- Infraorder: Cucujiformia
- Family: Cerambycidae
- Tribe: Pteropliini
- Genus: Desisa
- Species: D. takasagoana

Binomial name
- Desisa takasagoana Matsushita, 1933

Species of beetle

Desisa takasagoana is a species of beetle in the family Cerambycidae. It was described by Masaki Matsushita in 1933.
