= Desisa stramentosa =

Scientific classification
- Kingdom: Animalia
- Phylum: Arthropoda
- Class: Insecta
- Order: Coleoptera
- Suborder: Polyphaga
- Infraorder: Cucujiformia
- Family: Cerambycidae
- Genus: Desisa
- Species: D. stramentosa

Binomial name
- Desisa stramentosa Breuning & Itzinger, 1943

Synonyms
- Apomecynoides stramentosa Breuning, 1961

Species of beetle

Desisa stramentosa is a species of beetle in the family Cerambycidae. It was described by Stephan von Breuning and Itzinger in 1943.
