= Desisa variabilis =

Scientific classification
- Domain: Eukaryota
- Kingdom: Animalia
- Phylum: Arthropoda
- Class: Insecta
- Order: Coleoptera
- Suborder: Polyphaga
- Infraorder: Cucujiformia
- Family: Cerambycidae
- Tribe: Pteropliini
- Genus: Desisa
- Species: D. variabilis

Binomial name
- Desisa variabilis (Schwarzer, 1925)

Synonyms
- Mesopenthea variabilis Schwarzer, 1925

Species of beetle

Desisa variabilis is a species of beetle in the family Cerambycidae. It was described by Bernhard Schwarzer in 1925.
