= Desisa kuraruana =

Scientific classification
- Domain: Eukaryota
- Kingdom: Animalia
- Phylum: Arthropoda
- Class: Insecta
- Order: Coleoptera
- Suborder: Polyphaga
- Infraorder: Cucujiformia
- Family: Cerambycidae
- Tribe: Pteropliini
- Genus: Desisa
- Species: D. kuraruana

Binomial name
- Desisa kuraruana (Matsushita, 1935)

Species of beetle

Desisa kuraruana is a species of beetle in the family Cerambycidae. It was described by Masaki Matsushita in 1935.
