= Desisa =

Scientific classification
- Domain: Eukaryota
- Kingdom: Animalia
- Phylum: Arthropoda
- Class: Insecta
- Order: Coleoptera
- Suborder: Polyphaga
- Infraorder: Cucujiformia
- Family: Cerambycidae
- Tribe: Pteropliini
- Genus: Desisa

Genus of beetles

Desisa is a genus of longhorn beetles of the subfamily Lamiinae, containing the following species:

subgenus Cylindrostyrax

- Desisa bhutanensis (Breuning, 1968)
- Desisa lunulata (Pascoe, 1885)
- Desisa lunulatoides Breuning, 1968
- Desisa marmorata Breuning, 1938
- Desisa quadriplagiata Breuning, 1938
- Desisa stramentosa Breuning & Itzinger, 1943
- Desisa takasagoana Matsushita, 1933
- Desisa undulatofasciata Breuning, 1938
- Desisa uniformis Breuning, 1938

subgenus Desisa

- Desisa celebensis Breuning, 1959
- Desisa chinensis Breuning, 1938
- Desisa dispersa Pic, 1944
- Desisa javanica Breuning, 1969
- Desisa kuraruana (Matsushita, 1935)
- Desisa lateplagiata Breuning, 1938
- Desisa luzonica Breuning, 1938
- Desisa malaccensis Breuning, 1938
- Desisa parvula Breuning, 1938
- Desisa subfasciata (Pascoe, 1862)
- Desisa variabilis (Schwarzer, 1925)
- Desisa variegata Breuning, 1938

subgenus Mesodesisa

- Desisa reseolata Breuning, 1974
