= Desisa lunulata =

Scientific classification
- Kingdom: Animalia
- Phylum: Arthropoda
- Class: Insecta
- Order: Coleoptera
- Suborder: Polyphaga
- Infraorder: Cucujiformia
- Family: Cerambycidae
- Genus: Desisa
- Species: D. lunulata

Binomial name
- Desisa lunulata (Pascoe, 1885)

Synonyms
- Cylindrostyrax apomecynoides Aurivillius, 1911; Sthenias lunulatus Pascoe, 1885

Species of beetle

Desisa lunulata is a species of beetle in the family Cerambycidae. It was described by Francis Polkinghorne Pascoe in 1885. It is known from Borneo and Malaysia.
