= Desisa javanica =

Scientific classification
- Kingdom: Animalia
- Phylum: Arthropoda
- Class: Insecta
- Order: Coleoptera
- Suborder: Polyphaga
- Infraorder: Cucujiformia
- Family: Cerambycidae
- Genus: Desisa
- Species: D. javanica

Binomial name
- Desisa javanica Breuning, 1969

Species of beetle

Desisa javanica is a species of beetle in the family Cerambycidae. It was described by Stephan von Breuning in 1969.
