= Desisa dispersa =

Scientific classification
- Kingdom: Animalia
- Phylum: Arthropoda
- Class: Insecta
- Order: Coleoptera
- Suborder: Polyphaga
- Infraorder: Cucujiformia
- Family: Cerambycidae
- Genus: Desisa
- Species: D. dispersa

Binomial name
- Desisa dispersa Pic, 1944

Synonyms
- Mesosella dispersa Pic, 1944

Species of beetle

Desisa dispersa is a species of beetle in the family Cerambycidae. It was described by Maurice Pic in 1944.
