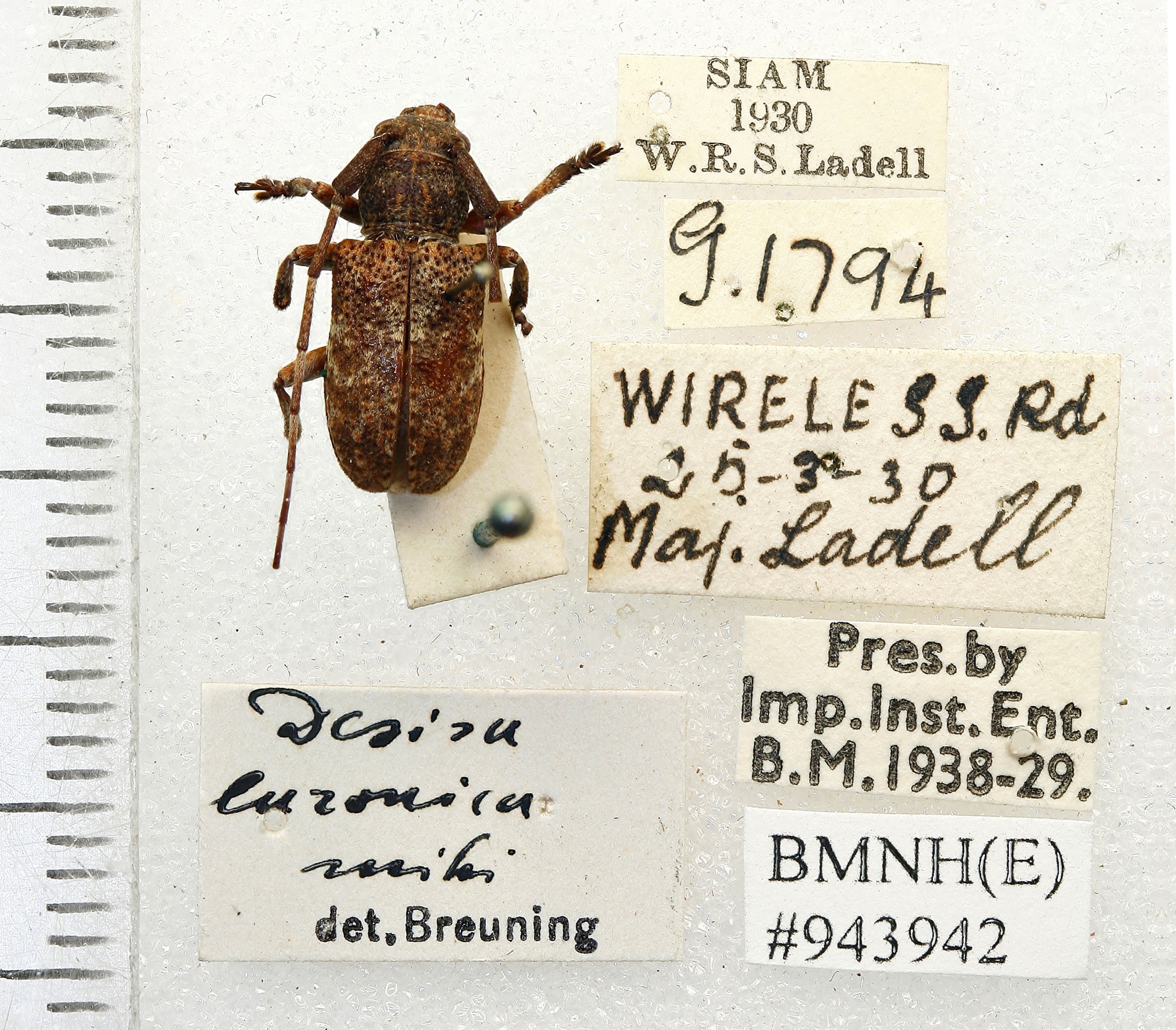
- Desisa Iuzonica

Scientific classification
- Kingdom: Animalia
- Phylum: Arthropoda
- Class: Insecta
- Order: Coleoptera
- Suborder: Polyphaga
- Infraorder: Cucujiformia
- Family: Cerambycidae
- Genus: Desisa
- Species: D. luzonica

Binomial name
- Desisa luzonica Breuning, 1938

= Desisa luzonica =

Species of beetle

Desisa luzonica is a species of beetle in the family Cerambycidae. It was described by Stephan von Breuning in 1938. It is known from Thailand, Borneo and the Philippines.
