= Desisa subfasciata =

Scientific classification
- Domain: Eukaryota
- Kingdom: Animalia
- Phylum: Arthropoda
- Class: Insecta
- Order: Coleoptera
- Suborder: Polyphaga
- Infraorder: Cucujiformia
- Family: Cerambycidae
- Tribe: Pteropliini
- Genus: Desisa
- Species: D. subfasciata

Binomial name
- Desisa subfasciata (Pascoe, 1862)

Synonyms
- Falsomesosella rufa Pic, 1936; Praonetha subfasciata Pascoe, 1862

Species of beetle

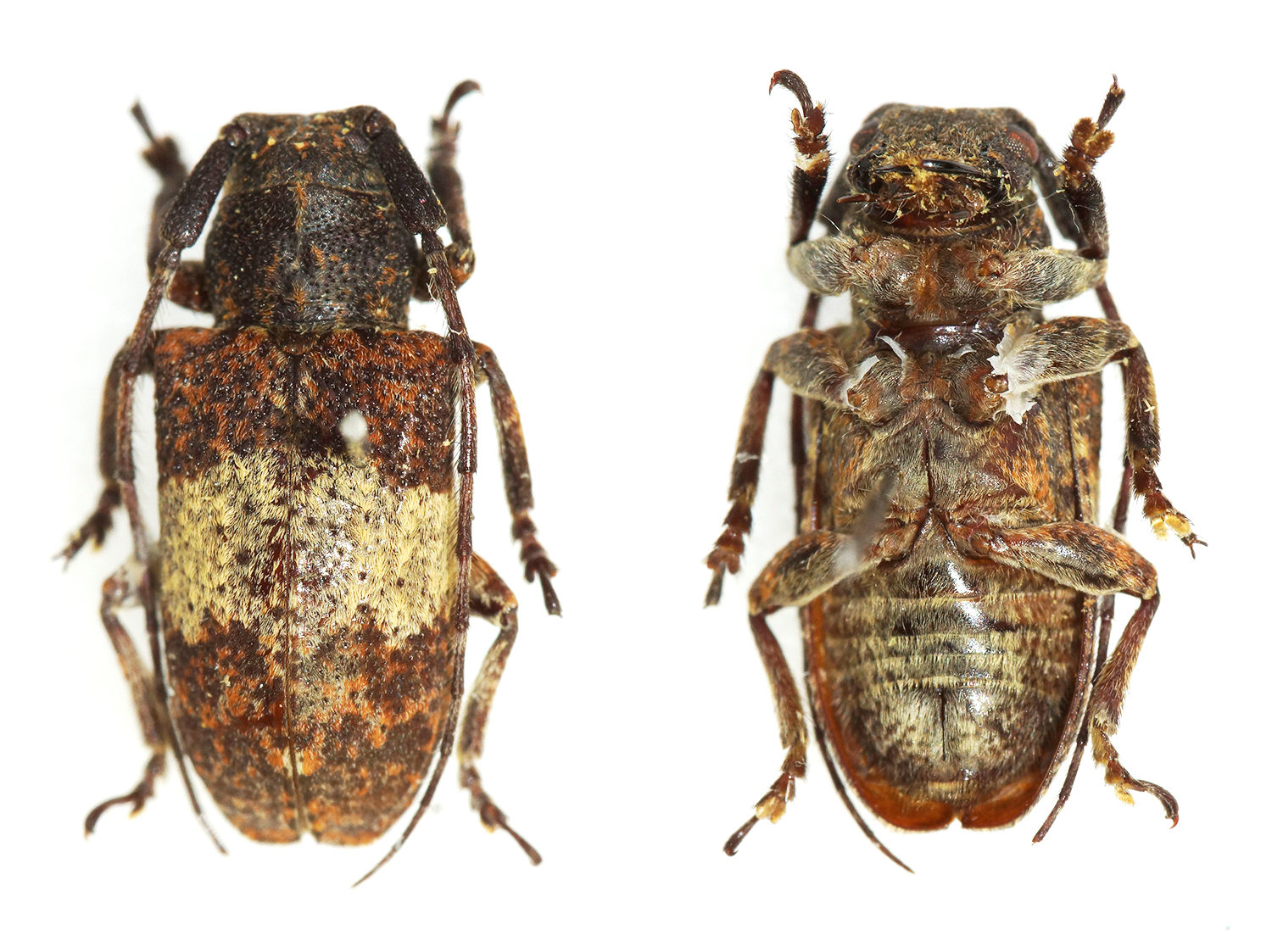
Female Desisa subfasciata

Desisa subfasciata is a species of beetle in the family Cerambycidae. It was described by Francis Polkinghorne Pascoe in 1862. It is known from India, Vietnam, Japan, China, Nepal, Cambodia, and Sumatra.

== Varietas ==
- Desisa subfasciata var. infasciata (Pic, 1944)
- Desisa subfasciata var. latefasciata (Pic, 1924)
