= Desisa lateplagiata =

Scientific classification
- Kingdom: Animalia
- Phylum: Arthropoda
- Class: Insecta
- Order: Coleoptera
- Suborder: Polyphaga
- Infraorder: Cucujiformia
- Family: Cerambycidae
- Genus: Desisa
- Species: D. lateplagiata

Binomial name
- Desisa lateplagiata Breuning, 1938

Species of beetle

Desisa lateplagiata is a species of beetle in the family Cerambycidae. It was described by Stephan von Breuning in 1938.
