= Neosybra costipennis =

Scientific classification
- Kingdom: Animalia
- Phylum: Arthropoda
- Class: Insecta
- Order: Coleoptera
- Suborder: Polyphaga
- Infraorder: Cucujiformia
- Family: Cerambycidae
- Genus: Neosybra
- Species: N. costipennis

Binomial name
- Neosybra costipennis Breuning, 1957

Species of beetle

Neosybra costipennis is a species of beetle in the family Cerambycidae. It was described by Breuning in 1957.
