= Neosybra cribrella =

Scientific classification
- Domain: Eukaryota
- Kingdom: Animalia
- Phylum: Arthropoda
- Class: Insecta
- Order: Coleoptera
- Suborder: Polyphaga
- Infraorder: Cucujiformia
- Family: Cerambycidae
- Genus: Neosybra
- Species: N. cribrella

Binomial name
- Neosybra cribrella (Bates, 1873)

Synonyms
- Sybra cribrella Bates, 1873

Species of beetle

Neosybra cribrella is a species of beetle in the family Cerambycidae. It was described by Henry Walter Bates in 1873.
