= Neosybra costata =

Scientific classification
- Domain: Eukaryota
- Kingdom: Animalia
- Phylum: Arthropoda
- Class: Insecta
- Order: Coleoptera
- Suborder: Polyphaga
- Infraorder: Cucujiformia
- Family: Cerambycidae
- Genus: Neosybra
- Species: N. costata

Binomial name
- Neosybra costata (Matsushita, 1933)

Species of beetle

Neosybra costata is a species of beetle in the family Cerambycidae. It was described by Matsushita in 1933.
