= Neosybra ropicoides =

Scientific classification
- Kingdom: Animalia
- Phylum: Arthropoda
- Class: Insecta
- Order: Coleoptera
- Suborder: Polyphaga
- Infraorder: Cucujiformia
- Family: Cerambycidae
- Genus: Neosybra
- Species: N. ropicoides

Binomial name
- Neosybra ropicoides Breuning

Species of beetle

Neosybra ropicoides is a species of beetle in the family Cerambycidae. It was described by Stephan von Breuning.
