= Neosybra =

Scientific classification
- Domain: Eukaryota
- Kingdom: Animalia
- Phylum: Arthropoda
- Class: Insecta
- Order: Coleoptera
- Suborder: Polyphaga
- Infraorder: Cucujiformia
- Family: Cerambycidae
- Tribe: Apomecynini
- Genus: Neosybra; Breuning, 1939

Type species
- Neosybra ropicoides Breuning, 1939

Genus of beetles

Neosybra is a genus of beetles in the family Cerambycidae, containing the following species:

- Neosybra clarkei Breuning, 1974
- Neosybra congoana Breuning, 1940
- Neosybra costata (Matsushita, 1933)
- Neosybra costipennis Breuning, 1957
- Neosybra cribrella (Bates, 1873)
- Neosybra cylindracea Breuning, 1940
- Neosybra cylindrica Breuning, 1939
- Neosybra elongatissima Breuning, 1939
- Neosybra excisa Breuning, 1939
- Neosybra flavovittata Breuning, 1954
- Neosybra flavovittipennis Breuning, 1963
- Neosybra fuscosignata Breuning, 1940
- Neosybra granulipennis Breuning, 1954
- Neosybra hachijoensis (Hayashi, 1961)
- Neosybra imitans Breuning, 1940
- Neosybra kenyensis Breuning, 1960
- Neosybra mabokensis Breuning, 1977
- Neosybra meridionalis Hunt & Breuning, 1957
- Neosybra mizoguchii Hayashi, 1956
- Neosybra ochreovittata Breuning, 1939
- Neosybra ropicoides Breuning
- Neosybra rotundipennis Breuning, 1939
- Neosybra ryukyuensis Breuning & Ohbayashi, 1964
- Neosybra sinuicosta Gressitt, 1951
- Neosybra strandi Breuning, 1939
