= Neosybra meridionalis =

Scientific classification
- Kingdom: Animalia
- Phylum: Arthropoda
- Class: Insecta
- Order: Coleoptera
- Suborder: Polyphaga
- Infraorder: Cucujiformia
- Family: Cerambycidae
- Genus: Neosybra
- Species: N. meridionalis

Binomial name
- Neosybra meridionalis Hunt & Breuning, 1957

Species of beetle

Neosybra meridionalis is a species of beetle in the family Cerambycidae. It was described by Hunt and Breuning in 1957.
