= Neosybra ryukyuensis =

Scientific classification
- Kingdom: Animalia
- Phylum: Arthropoda
- Class: Insecta
- Order: Coleoptera
- Suborder: Polyphaga
- Infraorder: Cucujiformia
- Family: Cerambycidae
- Genus: Neosybra
- Species: N. ryukyuensis

Binomial name
- Neosybra ryukyuensis Breuning & Ohbayashi, 1964

Species of beetle

Neosybra ryukyuensis is a species of beetle in the family Cerambycidae. It was described by Stephan von Breuning and Ohbayashi in 1964.
