= Neosybra flavovittipennis =

Scientific classification
- Kingdom: Animalia
- Phylum: Arthropoda
- Class: Insecta
- Order: Coleoptera
- Suborder: Polyphaga
- Infraorder: Cucujiformia
- Family: Cerambycidae
- Genus: Neosybra
- Species: N. flavovittipennis

Binomial name
- Neosybra flavovittipennis Breuning, 1963

Species of beetle

Neosybra flavovittipennis is a species of beetle in the family Cerambycidae. It was described by Breuning in 1963.
