= Neosybra clarkei =

Scientific classification
- Kingdom: Animalia
- Phylum: Arthropoda
- Class: Insecta
- Order: Coleoptera
- Suborder: Polyphaga
- Infraorder: Cucujiformia
- Family: Cerambycidae
- Genus: Neosybra
- Species: N. clarkei

Binomial name
- Neosybra clarkei Breuning, 1974

Species of beetle

Neosybra clarkei is a species of beetle in the family Cerambycidae. It was described by Breuning in 1974.
