= Neosybra mizoguchii =

Scientific classification
- Kingdom: Animalia
- Phylum: Arthropoda
- Class: Insecta
- Order: Coleoptera
- Suborder: Polyphaga
- Infraorder: Cucujiformia
- Family: Cerambycidae
- Genus: Neosybra
- Species: N. mizoguchii

Binomial name
- Neosybra mizoguchii Hayashi, 1956

Species of beetle

Neosybra mizoguchii is a species of beetle in the family Cerambycidae. It was described by Hayashi in 1956.
