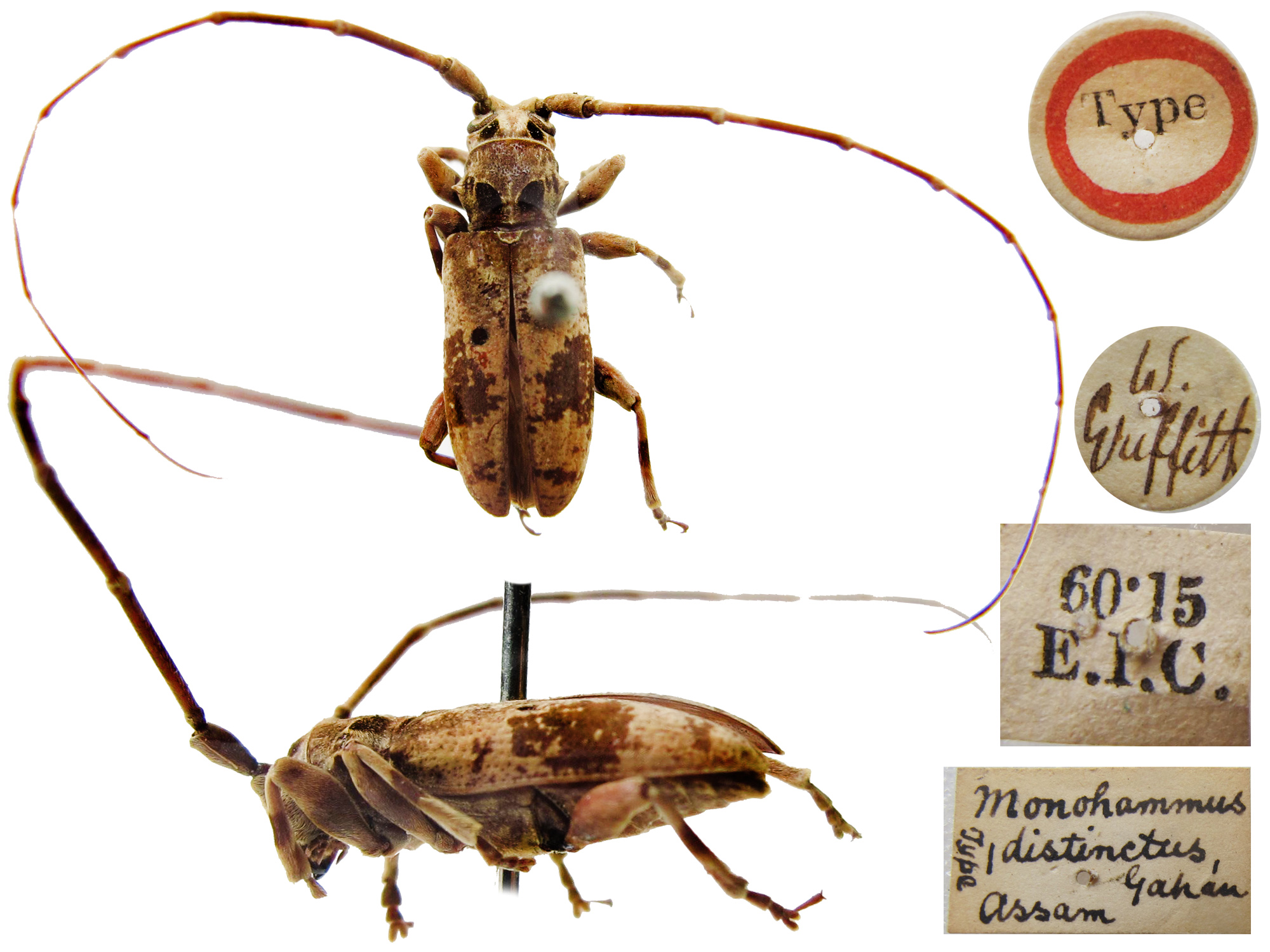

Scientific classification
- Domain: Eukaryota
- Kingdom: Animalia
- Phylum: Arthropoda
- Class: Insecta
- Order: Coleoptera
- Suborder: Polyphaga
- Infraorder: Cucujiformia
- Family: Cerambycidae
- Genus: Xenicotela
- Species: X. distincta

Binomial name
- Xenicotela distincta (Gahan, 1888)

Synonyms
- Monohammus distinctus Gahan 1888; Nephelotus 4-maculatus Pic, 1925; Nephelotus tonkineus Pic, 1926

= Xenicotela distincta =

Species of beetle

Xenicotela distincta is a species of beetle in the family Cerambycidae. It was described by Charles Joseph Gahan in 1888. It is known from Vietnam, India and Laos. It contains the varietas Xenicotela distincta var. tonkinensis.
