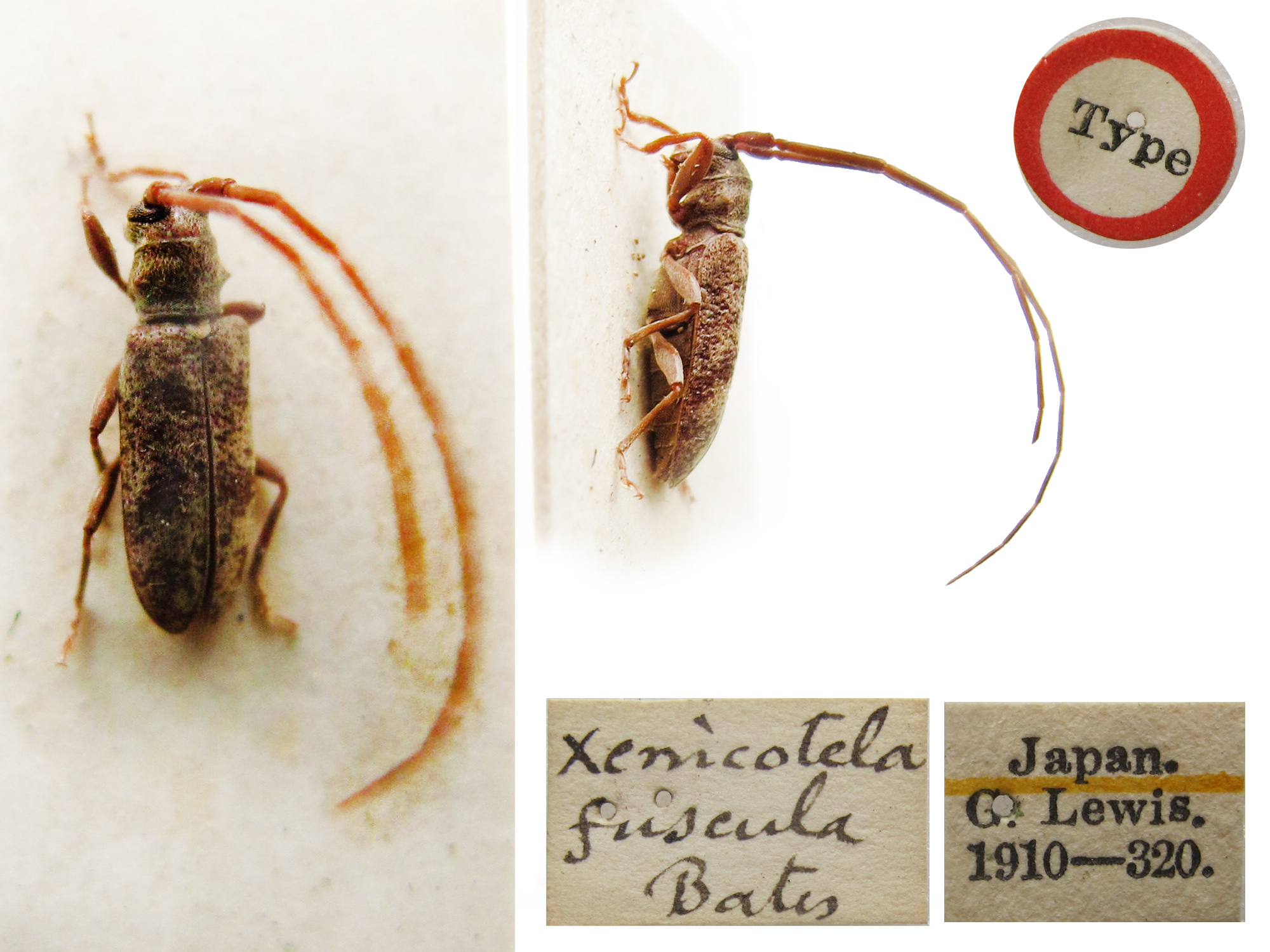
- Xenicotela fuscula bates

Scientific classification
- Domain: Eukaryota
- Kingdom: Animalia
- Phylum: Arthropoda
- Class: Insecta
- Order: Coleoptera
- Suborder: Polyphaga
- Infraorder: Cucujiformia
- Family: Cerambycidae
- Genus: Xenicotela
- Species: X. pardalina

Binomial name
- Xenicotela pardalina (Bates, 1884)

Synonyms
- Monohammus pardalinus Bates, 1884; Monochamus pardalinus (Bates, 1884); Xenicotela fuscula Bates, 1884

= Xenicotela pardalina =

Species of beetle

Xenicotela pardalina is a species of beetle in the family Cerambycidae. It was described by Henry Walter Bates in 1884, originally under the genus Monohammus. It is known from Japan.
