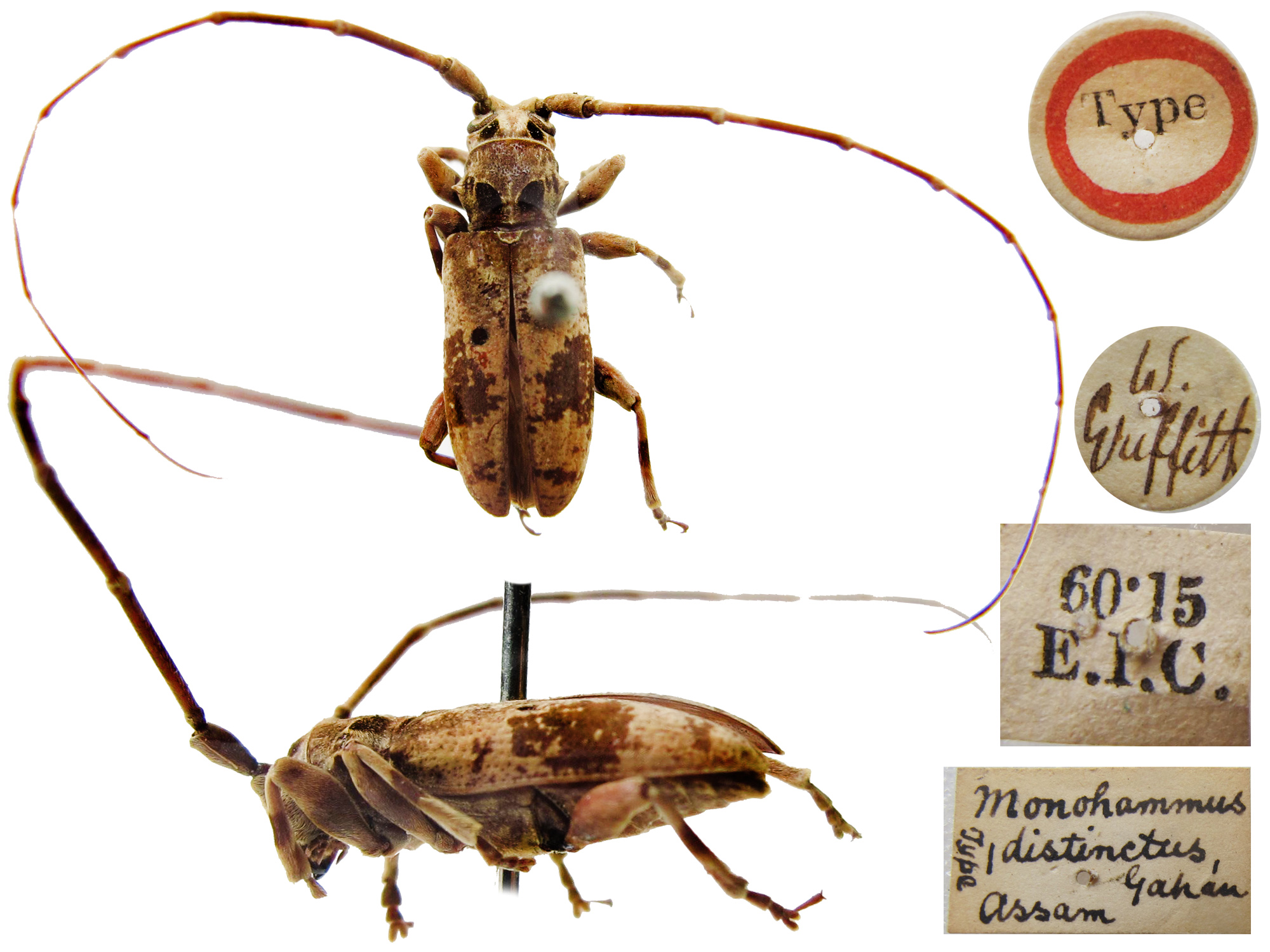
- Xenicotela distincta, a species of Xenicotela beetle

Scientific classification
- Kingdom: Animalia
- Phylum: Arthropoda
- Class: Insecta
- Order: Coleoptera
- Suborder: Polyphaga
- Infraorder: Cucujiformia
- Family: Cerambycidae
- Subfamily: Lamiinae
- Genus: Xenicotela; Bates, 1884

= Xenicotela =

Genus of beetles

Xenicotela is a genus of longhorn beetles of the subfamily Lamiinae, the sole member of the tribe Xenicotelini containing the following species:

- Xenicotela bimaculata (Pic, 1925)
- Xenicotela distincta (Gahan, 1888)
- Xenicotela pardalina (Bates, 1884)
