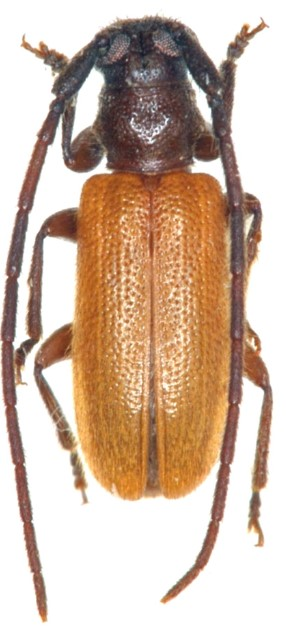

Scientific classification
- Kingdom: Animalia
- Phylum: Arthropoda
- Class: Insecta
- Order: Coleoptera
- Suborder: Polyphaga
- Infraorder: Cucujiformia
- Family: Cerambycidae
- Genus: Miccolamia
- Species: M. binodosa

Binomial name
- Miccolamia binodosa Pic, 1935

= Miccolamia binodosa =

Species of beetle

Miccolamia binodosa is a species of beetle in the family Cerambycidae. It was described by Maurice Pic in 1935. It is known from Vietnam.
