= Miccolamia albosetosa =

Scientific classification
- Kingdom: Animalia
- Phylum: Arthropoda
- Class: Insecta
- Order: Coleoptera
- Suborder: Polyphaga
- Infraorder: Cucujiformia
- Family: Cerambycidae
- Genus: Miccolamia
- Species: M. albosetosa

Binomial name
- Miccolamia albosetosa Gressitt, 1951

Species of beetle

Miccolamia albosetosa is a species of beetle in the family Cerambycidae. It was described by Gressitt in 1951. It is known from Taiwan.
