= Miccolamia verrucosa =

Scientific classification
- Kingdom: Animalia
- Phylum: Arthropoda
- Class: Insecta
- Order: Coleoptera
- Suborder: Polyphaga
- Infraorder: Cucujiformia
- Family: Cerambycidae
- Genus: Miccolamia
- Species: M. verrucosa

Binomial name
- Miccolamia verrucosa Bates, 1884

Species of beetle

Miccolamia verrucosa is a species of beetle in the family Cerambycidae. It was described by Bates in 1884. It is known from Japan.
