= Miccolamia thailandensis =

Scientific classification
- Kingdom: Animalia
- Phylum: Arthropoda
- Class: Insecta
- Order: Coleoptera
- Suborder: Polyphaga
- Infraorder: Cucujiformia
- Family: Cerambycidae
- Genus: Miccolamia
- Species: M. thailandensis

Binomial name
- Miccolamia thailandensis Breuning & Chujo, 1966

Species of beetle

Miccolamia thailandensis is a species of beetle in the family Cerambycidae. It was described by Stephan von Breuning and Chujo in 1966. It is known from Thailand (from which its species epithet is derived).
