= Miccolamia yakushimensis =

Scientific classification
- Kingdom: Animalia
- Phylum: Arthropoda
- Class: Insecta
- Order: Coleoptera
- Suborder: Polyphaga
- Infraorder: Cucujiformia
- Family: Cerambycidae
- Genus: Miccolamia
- Species: M. yakushimensis

Binomial name
- Miccolamia yakushimensis Hasegawa & N. Ohbayashi, 2001

Species of beetle

Miccolamia yakushimensis is a species of beetle in the family Cerambycidae. It was described by Hasegawa and N. Ohbayashi in 2001. It is known from Japan.
