= Miccolamia =

Scientific classification
- Kingdom: Animalia
- Phylum: Arthropoda
- Class: Insecta
- Order: Coleoptera
- Suborder: Polyphaga
- Infraorder: Cucujiformia
- Family: Cerambycidae
- Tribe: Desmiphorini
- Genus: Miccolamia

Genus of beetles

Miccolamia is a genus of longhorn beetles of the subfamily Lamiinae, containing the following species:

subgenus Isomiccolamia

- Miccolamia glabricula Bates, 1884
- Miccolamia inspinosa Takakuwa & N. Ohbayashi, 1995
- Miccolamia kaniei Takakuwa & N. Ohbayashi, 1992
- Miccolamia takakuwai Hasegawa & N. Ohbayashi, 2001
- Miccolamia tuberculata (Pic, 1918)
- Miccolamia tuberculipennis Breuning, 1947
- Miccolamia verrucosa Bates, 1884
- Miccolamia yakushimensis Hasegawa & N. Ohbayashi, 2001

subgenus Laomiccolamia

- Miccolamia laosensis Breuning, 1962
- Miccolamia thailandensis Breuning & Chujo, 1966

subgenus Miccolamia

- Miccolamia albosetosa Gressitt, 1951
- Miccolamia bicristata Pesarini & Sabbadini, 1997
- Miccolamia binodosa Pic, 1935
- Miccolamia cleroides Bates, 1884
- Miccolamia dracuncula Gressitt, 1942
- Miccolamia relucens Holzschuh, 2003
- Miccolamia rugosula Holzschuh, 2003
- Miccolamia savioi Gressitt, 1940
