= Miccolamia kaniei =

Scientific classification
- Kingdom: Animalia
- Phylum: Arthropoda
- Class: Insecta
- Order: Coleoptera
- Suborder: Polyphaga
- Infraorder: Cucujiformia
- Family: Cerambycidae
- Genus: Miccolamia
- Species: M. kaniei

Binomial name
- Miccolamia kaniei Takakuwa & N. Ohbayashi, 1992

Species of beetle

Miccolamia kaniei is a species of beetle in the family Cerambycidae. It was described by Takakuwa and N. Ohbayashi in 1992. It is known from Japan.
