= Miccolamia relucens =

Scientific classification
- Kingdom: Animalia
- Phylum: Arthropoda
- Class: Insecta
- Order: Coleoptera
- Suborder: Polyphaga
- Infraorder: Cucujiformia
- Family: Cerambycidae
- Genus: Miccolamia
- Species: M. relucens

Binomial name
- Miccolamia relucens Holzschuh, 2003

Species of beetle

Miccolamia relucens is a species of beetle in the family Cerambycidae. It was described by Holzschuh in 2003. It is known from India and Nepal.
