= Miccolamia tuberculata =

Scientific classification
- Kingdom: Animalia
- Phylum: Arthropoda
- Class: Insecta
- Order: Coleoptera
- Suborder: Polyphaga
- Infraorder: Cucujiformia
- Family: Cerambycidae
- Genus: Miccolamia
- Species: M. tuberculata

Binomial name
- Miccolamia tuberculata (Pic, 1918)

Synonyms
- Pogonochaerus tuberculatus Pic, 1918

Species of beetle

Miccolamia tuberculata is a species of beetle in the family Cerambycidae. It was described by Pic in 1918. It is known from Japan.
