= Miccolamia laosensis =

Scientific classification
- Kingdom: Animalia
- Phylum: Arthropoda
- Class: Insecta
- Order: Coleoptera
- Suborder: Polyphaga
- Infraorder: Cucujiformia
- Family: Cerambycidae
- Genus: Miccolamia
- Species: M. laosensis

Binomial name
- Miccolamia laosensis Breuning, 1962

Species of beetle

Miccolamia laosensis is a species of beetle in the family Cerambycidae. It was described by Stephan von Breuning in 1962. It is known from Laos.
