= Miccolamia glabricula =

Scientific classification
- Kingdom: Animalia
- Phylum: Arthropoda
- Class: Insecta
- Order: Coleoptera
- Suborder: Polyphaga
- Infraorder: Cucujiformia
- Family: Cerambycidae
- Genus: Miccolamia
- Species: M. glabricula

Binomial name
- Miccolamia glabricula Bates, 1884

Species of beetle

Miccolamia glabricula is a species of beetle in the family Cerambycidae. It was described by Henry Walter Bates in 1884.

== Subspecies ==
- Miccolamia glabricula glabricula Bates, 1884
- Miccolamia glabricula sadoensis Hasegawa & N. Ohbayashi, 2001
