= Miccolamia bicristata =

Scientific classification
- Kingdom: Animalia
- Phylum: Arthropoda
- Class: Insecta
- Order: Coleoptera
- Suborder: Polyphaga
- Infraorder: Cucujiformia
- Family: Cerambycidae
- Genus: Miccolamia
- Species: M. bicristata

Binomial name
- Miccolamia bicristata Pesarini & Sabbadini, 1997

Species of beetle

Miccolamia bicristata is a species of beetle in the family Cerambycidae. It was described by Pesarini and Sabbadini in 1997. It is known from China.
