= Miccolamia rugosula =

Scientific classification
- Kingdom: Animalia
- Phylum: Arthropoda
- Class: Insecta
- Order: Coleoptera
- Suborder: Polyphaga
- Infraorder: Cucujiformia
- Family: Cerambycidae
- Genus: Miccolamia
- Species: M. rugosula

Binomial name
- Miccolamia rugosula Holzschuh, 2003

Species of beetle

Miccolamia rugosula is a species of beetle in the family Cerambycidae. It was described by Holzschuh in 2003. It is known from India.
