= Miccolamia inspinosa =

Scientific classification
- Kingdom: Animalia
- Phylum: Arthropoda
- Class: Insecta
- Order: Coleoptera
- Suborder: Polyphaga
- Infraorder: Cucujiformia
- Family: Cerambycidae
- Genus: Miccolamia
- Species: M. inspinosa

Binomial name
- Miccolamia inspinosa Takakuwa & N. Ohbayashi, 1995

Species of beetle

Miccolamia inspinosa is a species of beetle in the family Cerambycidae. It was described by Takakuwa and N. Ohbayashi in 1995. It is known from Japan.
