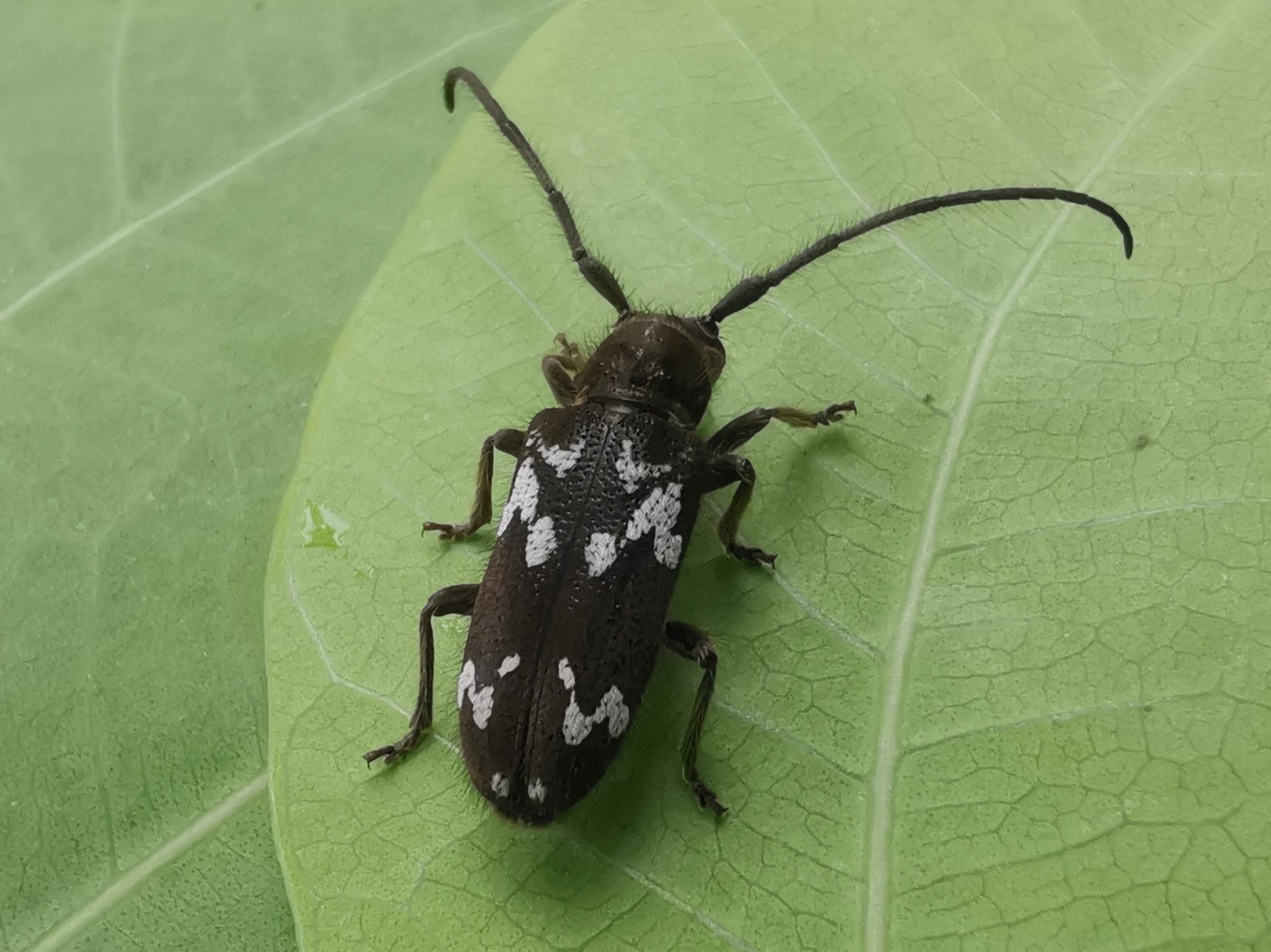

Scientific classification
- Kingdom: Animalia
- Phylum: Arthropoda
- Class: Insecta
- Order: Coleoptera
- Suborder: Polyphaga
- Infraorder: Cucujiformia
- Family: Cerambycidae
- Subfamily: Lamiinae
- Genus: Parasophronica; Breuning, 1940

= Parasophronica =

Genus of beetles

Parasophronica is a genus of longhorn beetles of the subfamily Lamiinae, containing the following species:

- Parasophronica albomaculata Breuning, 1956
- Parasophronica phlyaroides Breuning, 1982
- Parasophronica strandiella Breuning, 1940
