= Paramesosella maxima =

Scientific classification
- Kingdom: Animalia
- Phylum: Arthropoda
- Class: Insecta
- Order: Coleoptera
- Suborder: Polyphaga
- Infraorder: Cucujiformia
- Family: Cerambycidae
- Genus: Paramesosella
- Species: P. maxima

Binomial name
- Paramesosella maxima Hüdepohl, 1999

Species of beetle

Paramesosella maxima is a species of beetle in the family Cerambycidae. It was described by Karl-Ernst Hüdepohl in 1999.
