= Paramesosella stheniformis =

Scientific classification
- Kingdom: Animalia
- Phylum: Arthropoda
- Class: Insecta
- Order: Coleoptera
- Suborder: Polyphaga
- Infraorder: Cucujiformia
- Family: Cerambycidae
- Genus: Paramesosella
- Species: P. stheniformis

Binomial name
- Paramesosella stheniformis Breuning, 1940

Species of beetle

Paramesosella stheniformis is a species of beetle in the family Cerambycidae. It was described by Stephan von Breuning in 1940.
