= Paramesosella =

Scientific classification
- Kingdom: Animalia
- Phylum: Arthropoda
- Class: Insecta
- Order: Coleoptera
- Suborder: Polyphaga
- Infraorder: Cucujiformia
- Family: Cerambycidae
- Subfamily: Lamiinae
- Tribe: Pteropliini
- Genus: Paramesosella; Breuning, 1940

Genus of beetles

Paramesosella is a genus of longhorn beetles of the subfamily Lamiinae, containing the following species:

- Paramesosella affinis Breuning, 1970
- Paramesosella alboplagiata Breuning, 1948
- Paramesosella fasciculata Breuning, 1940
- Paramesosella gigantea Breuning, 1948
- Paramesosella maxima Hüdepohl, 1999
- Paramesosella medioalba Breuning, 1956
- Paramesosella plurifasciculata Breuning, 1970
- Paramesosella stheniformis Breuning, 1940
- Paramesosella sthenioides (Breuning, 1938)
