= Paramesosella sthenioides =

Scientific classification
- Kingdom: Animalia
- Phylum: Arthropoda
- Clade: Pancrustacea
- Class: Insecta
- Order: Coleoptera
- Suborder: Polyphaga
- Infraorder: Cucujiformia
- Family: Cerambycidae
- Genus: Paramesosella
- Species: P. sthenioides

Binomial name
- Paramesosella sthenioides (Breuning, 1938)

Species of beetle

Paramesosella sthenioides is a species of longhorn beetle in the family Cerambycidae. It was described by Stephan von Breuning in 1938.
