= Paramesosella medioalba =

Scientific classification
- Kingdom: Animalia
- Phylum: Arthropoda
- Class: Insecta
- Order: Coleoptera
- Suborder: Polyphaga
- Infraorder: Cucujiformia
- Family: Cerambycidae
- Genus: Paramesosella
- Species: P. medioalba

Binomial name
- Paramesosella medioalba Breuning, 1956

Species of beetle

Paramesosella medioalba is a species of beetle in the family Cerambycidae. It was described by Stephan von Breuning in 1956.
