= Eupogoniopsis omeimontis =

Scientific classification
- Kingdom: Animalia
- Phylum: Arthropoda
- Class: Insecta
- Order: Coleoptera
- Suborder: Polyphaga
- Infraorder: Cucujiformia
- Family: Cerambycidae
- Genus: Eupogoniopsis
- Species: E. omeimontis

Binomial name
- Eupogoniopsis omeimontis (Gressitt, 1938)

Synonyms
- Anaespogonius omeimontis Gressitt, 1938

Species of beetle

Eupogoniopsis omeimontis is a species of beetle in the family Cerambycidae. It was described by Gressitt in 1938.
