= Eupogoniopsis caudatula =

Scientific classification
- Kingdom: Animalia
- Phylum: Arthropoda
- Class: Insecta
- Order: Coleoptera
- Suborder: Polyphaga
- Infraorder: Cucujiformia
- Family: Cerambycidae
- Genus: Eupogoniopsis
- Species: E. caudatula

Binomial name
- Eupogoniopsis caudatula Holzschuh, 1999

Species of beetle

Eupogoniopsis caudatula is a species of beetle in the family Cerambycidae. It was described by Holzschuh in 1999.
