= Eupogoniopsis tenuicornis =

Scientific classification
- Kingdom: Animalia
- Phylum: Arthropoda
- Class: Insecta
- Order: Coleoptera
- Suborder: Polyphaga
- Infraorder: Cucujiformia
- Family: Cerambycidae
- Genus: Eupogoniopsis
- Species: E. tenuicornis

Binomial name
- Eupogoniopsis tenuicornis (Bates, 1884)

Species of beetle

Eupogoniopsis tenuicornis is a species of beetle in the family Cerambycidae. It was described by Bates in 1884.
