= Eupogoniopsis =

Scientific classification
- Kingdom: Animalia
- Phylum: Arthropoda
- Class: Insecta
- Order: Coleoptera
- Suborder: Polyphaga
- Infraorder: Cucujiformia
- Family: Cerambycidae
- Subfamily: Lamiinae
- Tribe: Desmiphorini
- Genus: Eupogoniopsis; Breuning, 1949

Genus of beetles

Eupogoniopsis is a genus of longhorn beetles of the subfamily Lamiinae, containing the following species:

- Eupogoniopsis caudatula Holzschuh, 1999
- Eupogoniopsis omeimontis (Gressitt, 1938)
- Eupogoniopsis sepicola Holzschuh, 1999
- Eupogoniopsis tenuicornis (Bates, 1884)
