= Marmylaris buckleyi =

Scientific classification
- Domain: Eukaryota
- Kingdom: Animalia
- Phylum: Arthropoda
- Class: Insecta
- Order: Coleoptera
- Suborder: Polyphaga
- Infraorder: Cucujiformia
- Family: Cerambycidae
- Tribe: Pteropliini
- Genus: Marmylaris
- Species: M. buckleyi

Binomial name
- Marmylaris buckleyi (Pascoe, 1857)

Synonyms
- Hathlia buckleyi Pascoe, 1857

Species of beetle

Marmylaris buckleyi is a species of beetle in the family Cerambycidae. It was described by Francis Polkinghorne Pascoe in 1857, originally under the genus Hathlia.
