= Marmylaris =

Scientific classification
- Domain: Eukaryota
- Kingdom: Animalia
- Phylum: Arthropoda
- Class: Insecta
- Order: Coleoptera
- Suborder: Polyphaga
- Infraorder: Cucujiformia
- Family: Cerambycidae
- Tribe: Pteropliini
- Genus: Marmylaris

Genus of beetles

Marmylaris is a genus of longhorn beetles of the subfamily Lamiinae, containing the following species:

- Marmylaris buckleyi (Pascoe, 1857)
- Marmylaris truncatipennis Breuning, 1940
