= Mimovitalisia tuberculata =

Scientific classification
- Kingdom: Animalia
- Phylum: Arthropoda
- Class: Insecta
- Order: Coleoptera
- Suborder: Polyphaga
- Infraorder: Cucujiformia
- Family: Cerambycidae
- Genus: Mimovitalisia
- Species: M. tuberculata

Binomial name
- Mimovitalisia tuberculata (Pic, 1924)

Species of beetle

Mimovitalisia tuberculata is a species of beetle in the family Cerambycidae. It was described by Pic in 1924.
