= Mimovitalisia =

Scientific classification
- Kingdom: Animalia
- Phylum: Arthropoda
- Class: Insecta
- Order: Coleoptera
- Suborder: Polyphaga
- Infraorder: Cucujiformia
- Family: Cerambycidae
- Tribe: Desmiphorini
- Genus: Mimovitalisia

Genus of beetles

Mimovitalisia is a genus of longhorn beetles of the subfamily Lamiinae, containing the following species:

- Mimovitalisia tuberculata (Pic, 1924)
- Mimovitalisia wittmeri Breuning, 1975
