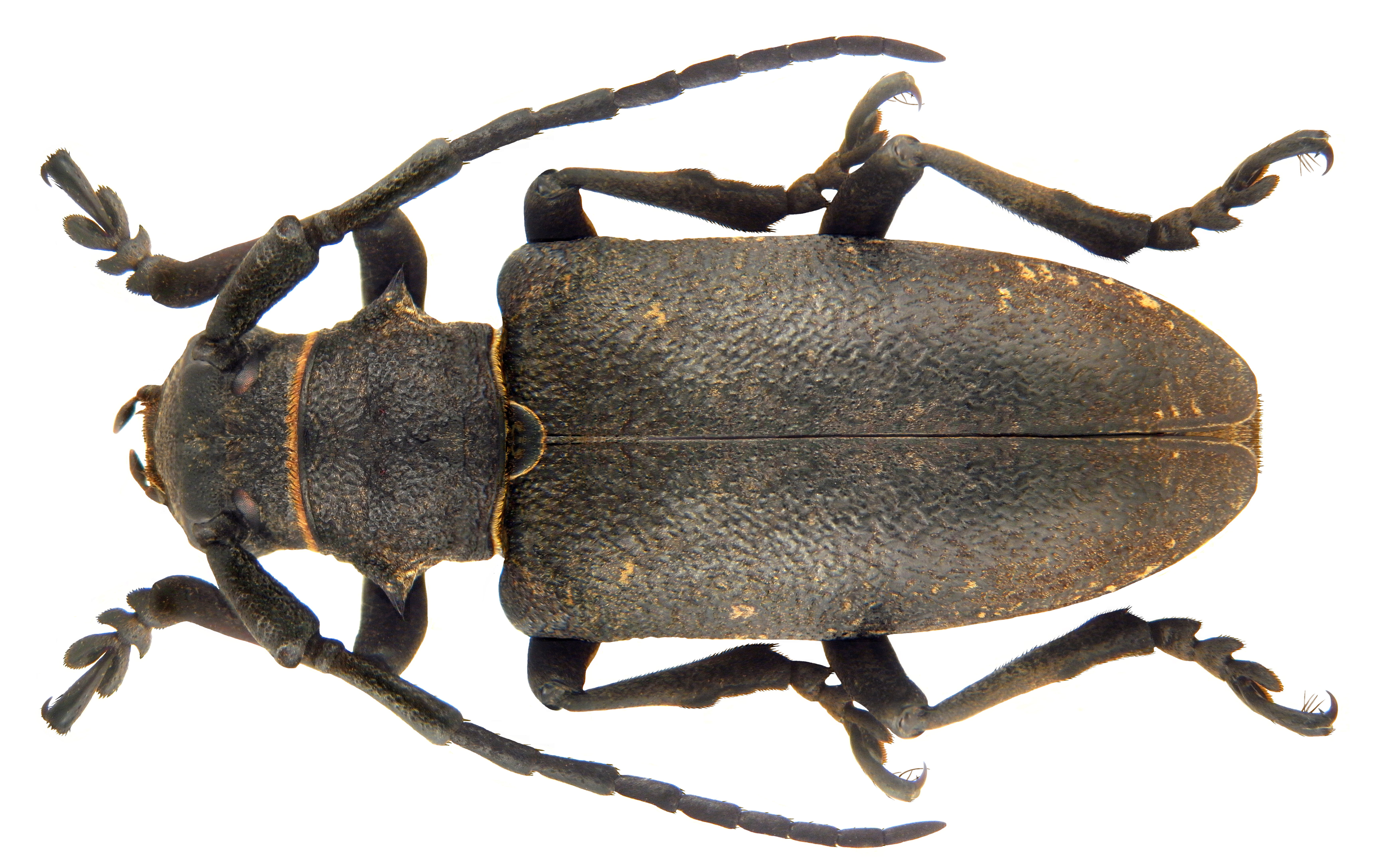
- Lamia textor

Scientific classification
- Kingdom: Animalia
- Phylum: Arthropoda
- Clade: Pancrustacea
- Class: Insecta
- Order: Coleoptera
- Suborder: Polyphaga
- Infraorder: Cucujiformia
- Family: Cerambycidae
- Subfamily: Lamiinae
- Tribe: Lamiini; Latreille, 1825

Synonyms
- Agniides (Thomson) Lacordaire, 1869; Agniini (Thomson) Aurivillius, 1921; Agniitae Thomson, 1864; Hebestolitae Thomson, 1864; Lamiides (Latreille) Lacordaire, 1869; Monochamides (Thomson) Lacordaire, 1869; Monochamini (Thomson) Aurivillius, 1921; Monochamitae Thomson, 1860; Potemnemini Aurivillius, 1921; Taeniotitae Thomson, 1864

= Lamiini =

Tribe of beetles

Lamiini is a tribe of longhorn beetles of the subfamily Lamiinae.

== Genera ==
- Acalolepta Pascoe, 1858
- Achthophora Newman, 1842
- Aethalodes Gahan, 1888
- Agnia Newman, 1842
- Agniohammus Breuning, 1936
- Agniolamia Breuning
- Agniomorpha Breuning, 1935
- Agniopsis Breuning, 1936
- Agnoderus Thomson, 1864
- Amechana J. Thomson, 1864
- Anamera Thomson, 1864
- Anameromorpha Pic, 1923
- Anhammus J. Thomson, 1860
- Annamanum Pic, 1925
- Anoplophora Hope, 1839
- Anoplophoroides Breuning, 1980
- Anthores Pascoe, 1869
- Archidice J. Thomson, 1864
- Arctolamia Gestro, 1888
- Aristobia J. Thomson, 1868
- Batomena Bates, 1884
- Bixadoides Breuning, 1966
- Bixadus Pascoe, 1868
- Blepephaeopsis Breuning, 1938
- Blepephaeus Pascoe, 1866
- Brachyhammus Kolbe
- Callipyrga Newman, 1842
- Cereopsius Pascoe, 1857
- Cerosterna Dejean, 1835
- Cesonium Dillon & Dillon, 1959
- Chyptodes Dillon & Dillon, 1941
- Cinctohammus Dillon & Dillon, 1959
- Combe Thomson, 1864
- Cordoxylamia Dillon & Dillon, 1959
- Cornuscoparia Jordan, 1894
- Coscinesthes Bates, 1890
- Cratotragus Lacordaire, 1869
- Cremnosterna Aurivillius, 1920
- Cribragapanthia Pic, 1903
- Cribrihammus Dillon & Dillon, 1959
- Cribrochamus Dillon & Dillon, 1961
- Cribrohammus Breuning, 1966
- Crucihammus Breuning, 1936
- Cyanagapanthia Breuning, 1968
- Cyriotasiastes Heller, 1924
- Decellia Breuning, 1968
- Deliathis Thomson, 1860
- Diallus Pascoe, 1866
- Didyochamus Dillon & Dillon, 1959
- Docohammus Aurivillius, 1908
- Docolamia Breuning, 1944
- Dohertyorsidis Breuning, 1961
- Dolichoprosopus Ritsema, 1881
- Domitia Thomson, 1858
- Epepeotes Pascoe, 1866
- Epicedia J. Thomson, 1864
- Epuraecha Breuning, 1935
- Eryalus Pascoe, 1888
- Eudihammus Breuning, 1944
- Euoplia Hope, 1939
- Eupromus Pascoe, 1868
- Eusyntheta Bates, 1889
- Eutaenia J. Thomson, 1857
- Euthyastus Pascoe, 1866
- Falsacalolepta Breuning, 1970
- Falsagnia Breuning, 1938
- Falsocylindropomus Pic, 1927
- Falsodihammus Breuning, 1942
- Falsomelanauster Breuning, 1940
- Gerania Audinet-Serville, 1835
- Gibbohammus Wang & Chiang, 1999
- Goes LeConte, 1852
- Granolamia Breuning, 1944
- Granulorsidis Breuning, 1980
- Guttulamia Dillon & Dillon, 1959
- Hainanhammus Gressitt, 1940
- Hammatoderus Gemminger & Harold, 1873
- Haplothrix Gahan, 1888
- Hebestola Haldeman, 1847
- Hechinoschema Thomson, 1857
- Hotarionomus J. Thomson, 1857
- Insulochamus Dillon & Dillon, 1961
- Ippitoides Dillon & Dillon, 1959
- Jeanvoinea Pic, 1934
- Laelida Pascoe, 1866
- Lamia Fabricius, 1775
- Lamiomimus Kolbe, 1886
- Leprodera J. Thomson, 1857
- Lesbra Dillon & Dillon, 1959
- Leuronotus Gahan, 1888
- Lochmodocerus Burne, 1984
- Macrochenus Guérin-Méneville, 1843
- Macrohammus Aurivillius, 1886
- Magninia Clermont, 1932
- Marmaroglypha Redtenbacher, 1868
- Mecynippus Bates, 1884
- Melanopolia Bates, 1884
- Meliochamus Dillon & Dillon, 1959
- Metaperiaptodes Breuning, 1943
- Metopides Pascoe, 1866
- Metoxylamia Dillon & Dillon, 1959
- Microgoes Casey, 1913
- Migsideres Gilmour, 1948
- Mimepuraecha Breuning, 1974
- Mimocoelosterna Breuning, 1940
- Mimocornuscoparia Breuning, 1970
- Mimocratotragus Pic, 1926
- Mimognoma Breuning, 1959
- Mimohammus Aurivillius, 1911
- Mimoleprodera Breuning, 1938
- Mimoleuronotus Breuning, 1968
- Mimolochus Thomson, 1868
- Mimomyagrus Breuning, 1970
- Mimonephelotes Breuning, 1970
- Mimonephelotus Breuning, 1940
- Mimopsacothea Breuning, 1973
- Mimorsidis Breuning, 1938
- Mimothestus Pic, 1935
- Mimotriammatus Breuning, 1972
- Mimotrysimia Breuning, 1948
- Mimoxylamia Breuning, 1977
- Monochamus Dejean, 1821
- Murzinia Lazarev, 2011
- Myagrus Pascoe, 1878
- Nanohammus Bates, 1884
- Nemophas Thomson, 1864
- Nemoplophora Wallin, Torstein & Nýlander, 2014
- Neodihammus Breuning, 1935
- Neoptychodes Dillon & Dillon, 1941
- Neoxenicotela Breuning, 1947
- Nephelotus Pascoe, 1866
- Nigrolamia Dillon & Dillon, 1959
- Nonochamus Dillon & Dillon, 1959
- Oculohammus Breuning & de Jong, 1941
- Odontolamia Breuning, 1944
- Omocyrius Pascoe, 1866
- Orsidis Pascoe, 1866
- Oxyhammus Kolbe, 1894
- Oxylamia Breuning, 1944
- Parabixadus Breuning, 1935
- Paracyriothasastes Breuning, 1978
- Paradiallus Breuning, 1950
- Paradihammus Breuning, 1935
- Paraepepeotes Pic, 1935
- Paragnia Gahan, 1893
- Paragniopsis Breuning, 1965
- Paraleprodera Breuning, 1935
- Paramelanauster Breuning, 1936
- Parametopides Breuning, 1936
- Paranamera Breuning, 1935
- Paranhammus Breuning, 1944
- Parapolytretus Breuning, 1944
- Parathyastus Aurivillius, 1913
- Parepicedia Breuning, 1943
- Pareutaenia Breuning, 1948
- Parhaplothrix Breuning, 1935
- Paruraecha Breuning, 1935
- Peblephaeus Kusama & Takakuwa, 1984
- Pelargoderus Audinet-Serville, 1835
- Penhammus Kolbe, 1894
- Periaptodes Pascoe, 1866
- Peribasis J. Thomson, 1864
- Pericycos Breuning, 1944
- Pharsalia Thomson, 1864
- Phrynetolamia Breuning, 1935
- Plectrodera Dejean, 1837
- Polytretus Gahan, 1893
- Potemnemus Thomson, 1864
- Prodomitia Jordan, 1894
- Psacothea Gahan, 1888
- Pseudanamera Breuning, 1935
- Pseudangulatus Dillon & Dillon, 1959
- Pseudanhammus Ritsema, 1889
- Pseudaristobia Breuning, 1943
- Pseudhammus Kolbe, 1894
- Pseudobixadus Breuning, 1936
- Pseudocelosterna Breuning, 1943
- Pseudocoedomea Breuning, 1971
- Pseudocyriocrates Breuning, 1935
- Pseudodihammus Breuning, 1936
- Pseudomacrochenus Breuning, 1942
- Pseudomeges Breuning, 1942
- Pseudometopides Breuning, 1936
- Pseudomonochamus Breuning, 1943
- Pseudomyagrus Breuning, 1944
- Pseudonemophas Breuning, 1944
- Pseudopsacothea Pic, 1935
- Pseudorsidis Breuning, 1944
- Pseudotaeniotes Dillon & Dillon, 1949
- Pseudothestus Breuning, 1943
- Pseudotrachystola Breuning, 1943
- Pseudoxenicotela Breuning, 1959
- Pseuduraecha Pic, 1925
- Ptychodes Audinet-Serville, 1835
- Rufohammus Breuning, 1939
- Sarothrocera White, 1864
- Spinaristobia Breuning, 1963
- Stegenagapanthia Pic, 1924
- Stegenodes Breuning, 1942
- Stegenus Pascoe, 1857
- Sternohammus Breuning, 1935
- Sternorsidis Breuning, 1959
- Strandiata Breuning, 1936
- Stratioceros Lacordaire, 1869
- Striatorsidis Breuning, 1960
- Superagnia Breuning, 1968
- Taeniotes Audinet-Serville, 1835
- Teocchiana Jiroux, Garreau, Bentanachs & Prévost, 2014
- Thermonotus Gahan, 1888
- Thestus Pascoe, 1866
- Thylactomimus Breuning, 1959
- Tomohammus Breuning, 1935
- Tomolamia Lameere, 1893
- Trachystohamus Pic, 1936
- Trachystola Pascoe, 1862
- Trachystolodes Breuning, 1943
- Triammatus Chevrolat, 1856
- Trichacalolepta Breuning, 1982
- Trichagnia Breuning, 1938
- Trichamechana Breuning, 1938
- Trichocoscinesthes Breuning, 1954
- Trichohammus Breuning, 1938
- Tricholamia Bates, 1884
- Trichomelanauster Breuning, 1983
- Trichomonochamus Breuning, 1953
- Trichonemophas Breuning, 1971
- Trichorsidis Breuning, 1965
- Trysimia Pascoe, 1866
- Tympanopalpus Redtenbacher, 1868
- Uraecha Thomson, 1864
- Uraechoides Breuning, 1981
- Xenicotelopsis Breuning, 1947
- Xenohammus Schwarzer, 1931
- Xoes Pascoe, 1866
