= M. celebensis =

M. celebensis may refer to:

- Miltasura celebensis, a moth species
- Mimepuraecha celebensis, a beetle species
- Mimomyromeus celebensis, a beetle species
- Miratesta celebensis, a snail species
- Mordella celebensis, a beetle species
- Mordellistena celebensis, a beetle species
- Myza celebensis, the dark-eared myza, a bird species
