= Parhaplothrix sulphureus =

Scientific classification
- Kingdom: Animalia
- Phylum: Arthropoda
- Class: Insecta
- Order: Coleoptera
- Suborder: Polyphaga
- Infraorder: Cucujiformia
- Family: Cerambycidae
- Genus: Parhaplothrix
- Species: P. sulphureus

Binomial name
- Parhaplothrix sulphureus Breuning, 1954

Species of beetle

Parhaplothrix sulphureus is a species of beetle in the family Cerambycidae. It was described by Stephan von Breuning in 1954. It is known from Sumatra.
