= Anameromorpha =

Scientific classification
- Kingdom: Animalia
- Phylum: Arthropoda
- Class: Insecta
- Order: Coleoptera
- Suborder: Polyphaga
- Infraorder: Cucujiformia
- Family: Cerambycidae
- Tribe: Lamiini
- Genus: Anameromorpha

Genus of beetles

Anameromorpha is a genus of longhorn beetles of the subfamily Lamiinae, containing the following species:

- Anameromorpha metallica Pic, 1923
- Anameromorpha pollinosa Holzschuh, 2009
- Anameromorpha unicolor Pic, 1923
