= Docohammus bennigseni =

Scientific classification
- Kingdom: Animalia
- Phylum: Arthropoda
- Class: Insecta
- Order: Coleoptera
- Suborder: Polyphaga
- Infraorder: Cucujiformia
- Family: Cerambycidae
- Genus: Docohammus
- Species: D. bennigseni

Binomial name
- Docohammus bennigseni Aurivillius, 1908

Synonyms
- Brachyhammus elongatus Breuning, 1986

Species of beetle

Docohammus bennigseni is a species of beetle in the family Cerambycidae. It was described by Per Olof Christopher Aurivillius in 1908. It is known from Tanzania, Ethiopia, Namibia, Kenya, and Somalia. It feeds on Acalypha neptunica.

== Subspecies ==
- Docohammus bennigseni aethiopicus Teocchi, Jiroux & Sudre, 2004
- Docohammus bennigseni bennigseni Aurivillius, 1908
- Docohammus bennigseni franzae Dillon & Dillon, 1959
- Docohammus benningseni somalicus Teocchi, 1991
