= Parhaplothrix margaretae =

Scientific classification
- Kingdom: Animalia
- Phylum: Arthropoda
- Class: Insecta
- Order: Coleoptera
- Suborder: Polyphaga
- Infraorder: Cucujiformia
- Family: Cerambycidae
- Genus: Parhaplothrix
- Species: P. margaretae

Binomial name
- Parhaplothrix margaretae Gilmour, 1947

Synonyms
- Parhoplothrix margarethae Breuning, 1961 (Lapsus calami)

Species of beetle

Parhaplothrix margaretae is a species of beetle in the family Cerambycidae. It was described by E. Forrest Gilmour in 1947. It is known from Malaysia.
