= Cyanagapanthia aurecens =

Scientific classification
- Kingdom: Animalia
- Phylum: Arthropoda
- Class: Insecta
- Order: Coleoptera
- Suborder: Polyphaga
- Infraorder: Cucujiformia
- Family: Cerambycidae
- Genus: Cyanagapanthia
- Species: C. aurecens

Binomial name
- Cyanagapanthia aurecens Wang & Zheng, 2002

Species of beetle

Cyanagapanthia aurecens is a member of the long-horned beetle family, Cerambycidae, which is known for its elongated bodies and long antennae. This particular species was first described by Wang and Zheng in 2002 and is found in China.
