= Microgoes =

Scientific classification
- Kingdom: Animalia
- Phylum: Arthropoda
- Class: Insecta
- Order: Coleoptera
- Suborder: Polyphaga
- Infraorder: Cucujiformia
- Family: Cerambycidae
- Tribe: Lamiini
- Genus: Microgoes; Casey, 1913
- Species: M. oculatus

Binomial name
- Microgoes oculatus (LeConte, 1862)

Genus of beetles

Microgoes is a monotypic beetle genus in the family Cerambycidae described by Casey in 1913. Its single species, Microgoes oculatus, was described by John Lawrence LeConte in 1862.
