= Pareutaenia arnaudi =

Scientific classification
- Kingdom: Animalia
- Phylum: Arthropoda
- Class: Insecta
- Order: Coleoptera
- Suborder: Polyphaga
- Infraorder: Cucujiformia
- Family: Cerambycidae
- Genus: Pareutaenia
- Species: P. arnaudi

Binomial name
- Pareutaenia arnaudi Breuning, 1962

Species of beetle

Pareutaenia arnaudi is a species of beetle in the family Cerambycidae. It was described by Stephan von Breuning in 1962.
