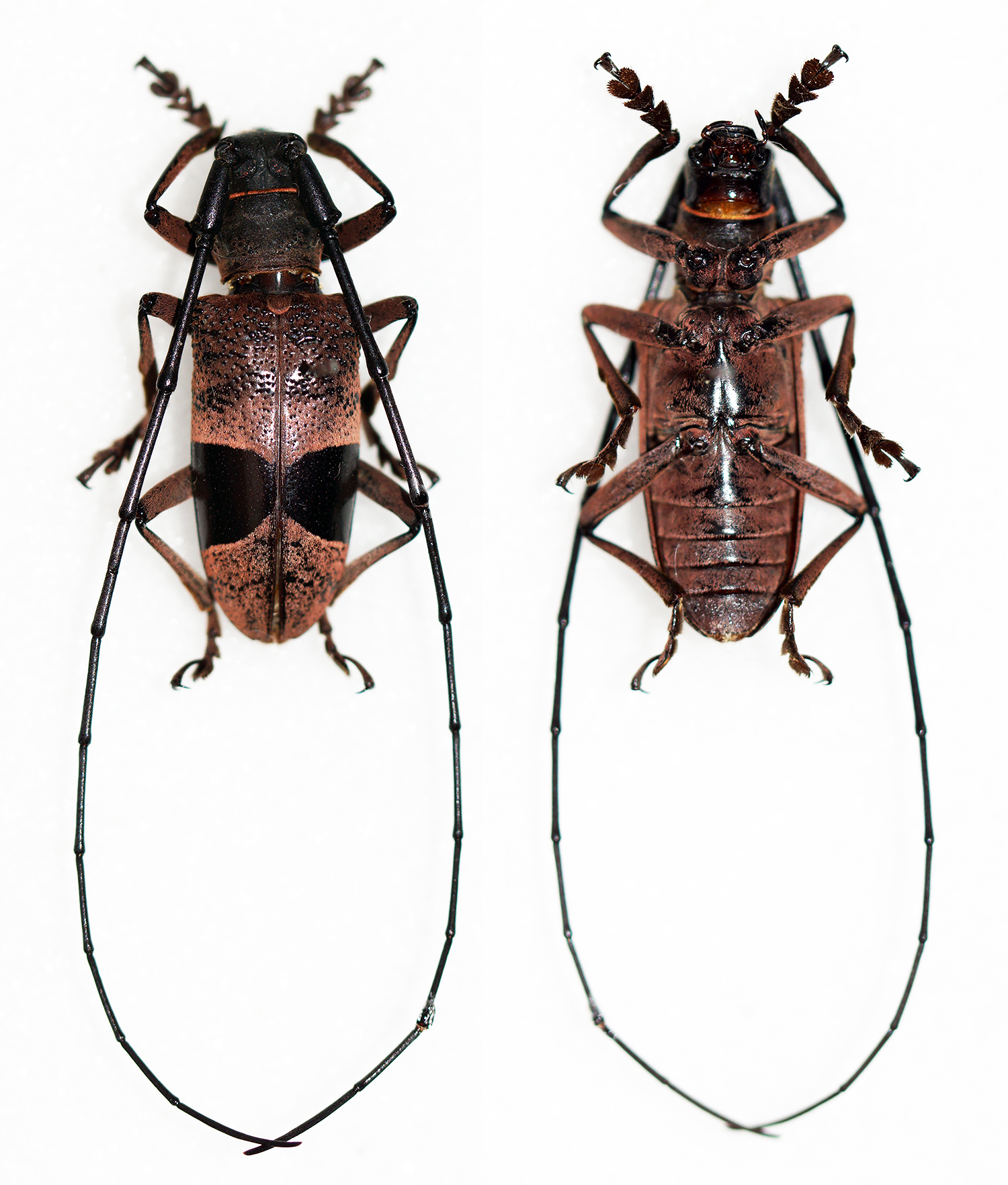

Scientific classification
- Domain: Eukaryota
- Kingdom: Animalia
- Phylum: Arthropoda
- Class: Insecta
- Order: Coleoptera
- Suborder: Polyphaga
- Infraorder: Cucujiformia
- Family: Cerambycidae
- Subfamily: Lamiinae
- Tribe: Monochamini
- Genus: Archidice; Thomson, 1864
- Species: A. castelnaudii

Binomial name
- Archidice castelnaudii Thomson, 1864

= Archidice castelnaudii =

Genus of beetles

Archidice castelnaudii is a species of beetle in the family Cerambycidae, and the only species in the genus Archidice. It is found in Malaysia.

This species was described by J. Thomson in 1864.
