= Docohammus orientalis =

Scientific classification
- Kingdom: Animalia
- Phylum: Arthropoda
- Class: Insecta
- Order: Coleoptera
- Suborder: Polyphaga
- Infraorder: Cucujiformia
- Family: Cerambycidae
- Genus: Docohammus
- Species: D. orientalis

Binomial name
- Docohammus orientalis Breuning, 1986

Species of insect

Docohamus orientalis is a species of beetle in the family Cerambycidae. It was described by Stephan von Breuning in 1986. It is known from Tanzania and Kenya.
