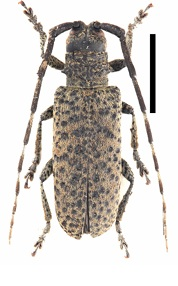

Scientific classification
- Kingdom: Animalia
- Phylum: Arthropoda
- Class: Insecta
- Order: Coleoptera
- Suborder: Polyphaga
- Infraorder: Cucujiformia
- Family: Cerambycidae
- Genus: Coscinesthes
- Species: C. porosa

Binomial name
- Coscinesthes porosa Bates, 1890

Synonyms
- Coscinesthes grossefoveata Breuning, 1957; Coscinesthes multiperforatus Pic, 1931

= Coscinesthes porosa =

Species of beetle

Coscinesthes porosa is a species of beetle in the family Cerambycidae. It was described by Henry Walter Bates in 1890. This species is found in China ((Sichuan, Yunnan, Xizang, Zhejiang).
