= Jeanvoinea =

Scientific classification
- Domain: Eukaryota
- Kingdom: Animalia
- Phylum: Arthropoda
- Class: Insecta
- Order: Coleoptera
- Suborder: Polyphaga
- Infraorder: Cucujiformia
- Family: Cerambycidae
- Tribe: Lamiini
- Genus: Jeanvoinea

Genus of beetles

Jeanvoinea is a genus of longhorn beetles of the subfamily Lamiinae, containing the following species:

- Jeanvoinea annulipes Pic, 1934
- Jeanvoinea borneensis Breuning, 1961
