= Coscinesthes minuta =

Scientific classification
- Kingdom: Animalia
- Phylum: Arthropoda
- Class: Insecta
- Order: Coleoptera
- Suborder: Polyphaga
- Infraorder: Cucujiformia
- Family: Cerambycidae
- Genus: Coscinesthes
- Species: C. minuta

Binomial name
- Coscinesthes minuta Pu, 1985

Species of beetle

Coscinesthes minuta is a species of beetle in the family Cerambycidae. It was described by Pu in 1985.
