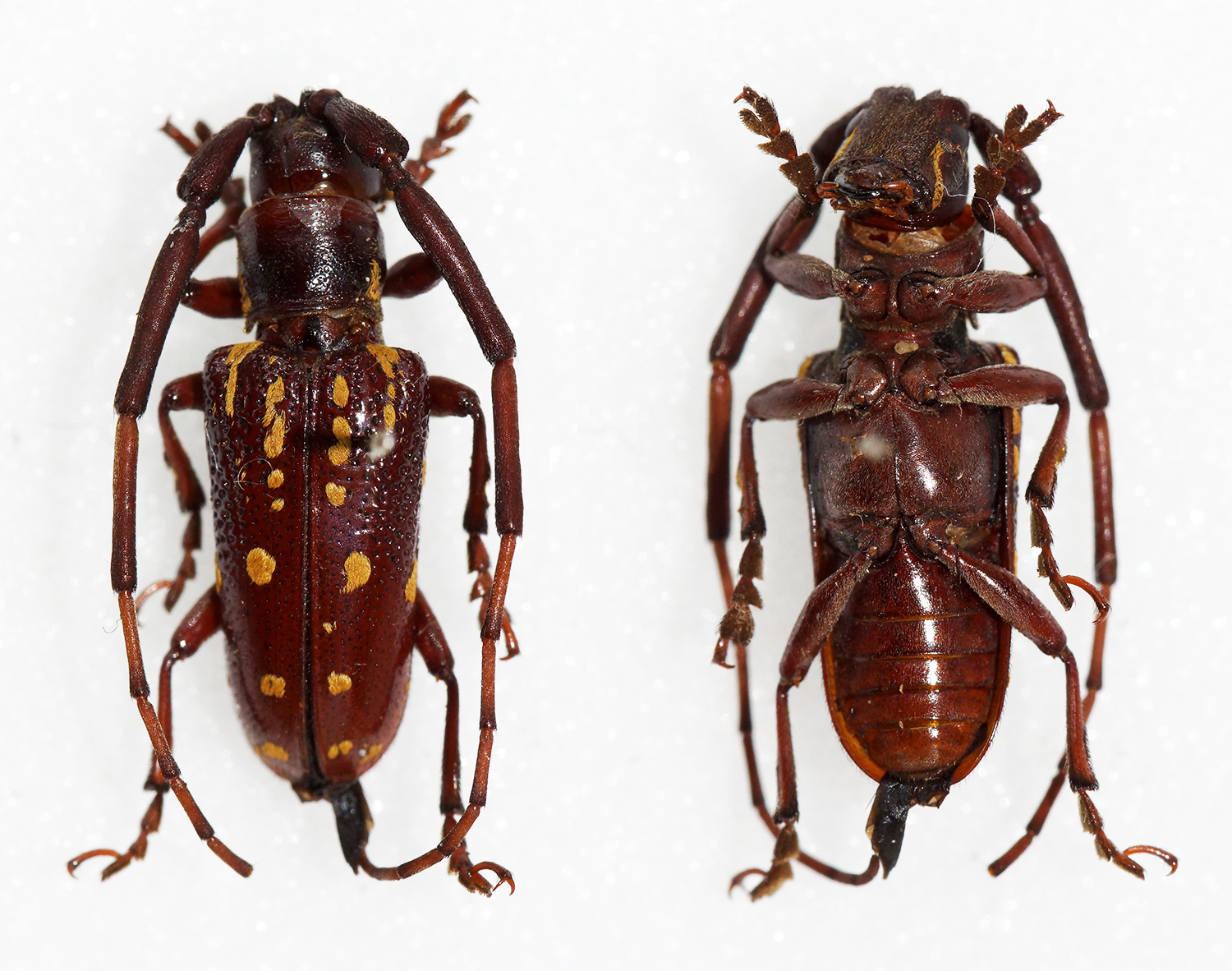
- Paragnia fulvomaculata

Scientific classification
- Kingdom: Animalia
- Phylum: Arthropoda
- Class: Insecta
- Order: Coleoptera
- Suborder: Polyphaga
- Infraorder: Cucujiformia
- Family: Cerambycidae
- Tribe: Lamiini
- Genus: Paragnia; Gahan, 1893

= Paragnia =

Genus of beetles

Paragnia is a genus of Asian beetles in the family Cerambycidae and tribe Lamiini.

== Species ==
BioLib includes:

1. Paragnia fulvomaculata Gahan, 1893 - type species from Indochina
2. Paragnia tiani Huang, Li & Zhang, 2020
