= Jeanvoinea annulipes =

Scientific classification
- Kingdom: Animalia
- Phylum: Arthropoda
- Class: Insecta
- Order: Coleoptera
- Suborder: Polyphaga
- Infraorder: Cucujiformia
- Family: Cerambycidae
- Genus: Jeanvoinea
- Species: J. annulipes

Binomial name
- Jeanvoinea annulipes Pic, 1934

Species of beetle

Jeanvoinea annulipes is a species of beetle in the family Cerambycidae. It was described by Maurice Pic in 1934. It is known from Vietnam.
