= Metaperiaptodes granulatus =

Scientific classification
- Kingdom: Animalia
- Phylum: Arthropoda
- Class: Insecta
- Order: Coleoptera
- Suborder: Polyphaga
- Infraorder: Cucujiformia
- Family: Cerambycidae
- Genus: Metaperiaptodes
- Species: M. granulatus

Binomial name
- Metaperiaptodes granulatus (Aurivillius, 1908)

Synonyms
- Periaptodes granulatus Aurivillius, 1908

Species of beetle

Metaperiaptodes granulatus is a species of beetle in the family Cerambycidae. It was described by Per Olof Christopher Aurivillius in 1908. It is known from Papua New Guinea.
