= Mimohammus =

Scientific classification
- Kingdom: Animalia
- Phylum: Arthropoda
- Class: Insecta
- Order: Coleoptera
- Suborder: Polyphaga
- Infraorder: Cucujiformia
- Family: Cerambycidae
- Tribe: Lamiini
- Genus: Mimohammus; Aurivillius, 1911
- Species: M. flavescens

Binomial name
- Mimohammus flavescens Aurivillius, 1911

Genus of beetles

Mimohammus is a monotypic beetle genus in the family Cerambycidae described by Per Olof Christopher Aurivillius in 1911. Its only species, Mimohammus flavescens, was described by the same author in the same year.
