= Paramelanauster variegatus =

Scientific classification
- Kingdom: Animalia
- Phylum: Arthropoda
- Class: Insecta
- Order: Coleoptera
- Suborder: Polyphaga
- Infraorder: Cucujiformia
- Family: Cerambycidae
- Genus: Paramelanauster
- Species: P. variegatus

Binomial name
- Paramelanauster variegatus Gressitt, 1940

Synonyms
- Paramelanauster sciamai Breuning, 1962

Species of beetle

Paramelanauster variegatus is a species of beetle in the family Cerambycidae. It was described by Gressitt in 1940.
