= Pseudaristobia =

Scientific classification
- Kingdom: Animalia
- Phylum: Arthropoda
- Class: Insecta
- Order: Coleoptera
- Suborder: Polyphaga
- Infraorder: Cucujiformia
- Family: Cerambycidae
- Tribe: Lamiini
- Genus: Pseudaristobia; Breuning, 1943
- Species: P. octofasciculata

Binomial name
- Pseudaristobia octofasciculata (Aurivillius, 1927)

Genus of beetles

Pseudaristobia is a monotypic beetle genus in the family Cerambycidae described by Stephan von Breuning in 1943. Its only species, Pseudaristobia octofasciculata, was described by Per Olof Christopher Aurivillius in 1927.
