= Jeanvoinea borneensis =

Scientific classification
- Kingdom: Animalia
- Phylum: Arthropoda
- Class: Insecta
- Order: Coleoptera
- Suborder: Polyphaga
- Infraorder: Cucujiformia
- Family: Cerambycidae
- Genus: Jeanvoinea
- Species: J. borneensis

Binomial name
- Jeanvoinea borneensis Breuning, 1961

Species of beetle

Jeanvoinea borneensis is a species of beetle in the family Cerambycidae. It was described by Stephan von Breuning in 1961 and was discovered in Borneo.
