= Laelida =

Scientific classification
- Domain: Eukaryota
- Kingdom: Animalia
- Phylum: Arthropoda
- Class: Insecta
- Order: Coleoptera
- Suborder: Polyphaga
- Infraorder: Cucujiformia
- Family: Cerambycidae
- Tribe: Lamiini
- Genus: Laelida

Genus of beetles

Laelida is a genus of longhorn beetles of the subfamily Lamiinae, containing the following species:

- Laelida alboochracea Hüdepohl, 1998
- Laelida antennata Pascoe, 1866
