= Laelida alboochracea =

Scientific classification
- Kingdom: Animalia
- Phylum: Arthropoda
- Class: Insecta
- Order: Coleoptera
- Suborder: Polyphaga
- Infraorder: Cucujiformia
- Family: Cerambycidae
- Genus: Laelida
- Species: L. alboochracea

Binomial name
- Laelida alboochracea Hüdepohl, 1998

Species of beetle

Laelida alboochracea is a species of beetle in the family Cerambycidae. It was described by Karl-Ernst Hüdepohl in 1998. It is known from Borneo and Malaysia.
