= Coscinesthes =

Scientific classification
- Kingdom: Animalia
- Phylum: Arthropoda
- Class: Insecta
- Order: Coleoptera
- Suborder: Polyphaga
- Infraorder: Cucujiformia
- Family: Cerambycidae
- Tribe: Lamiini
- Genus: Coscinesthes

Genus of beetles

Coscinesthes is a genus of longhorn beetles of the subfamily Lamiinae, containing the following species:

- Coscinesthes minuta Pu, 1985
- Coscinesthes porosa Bates, 1890
- Coscinesthes salicis Gressitt, 1951
