= Metaperiaptodes =

Scientific classification
- Kingdom: Animalia
- Phylum: Arthropoda
- Class: Insecta
- Order: Coleoptera
- Suborder: Polyphaga
- Infraorder: Cucujiformia
- Family: Cerambycidae
- Tribe: Lamiini
- Genus: Metaperiaptodes

Genus of beetles

Metaperiaptodes is a genus of longhorn beetles of the subfamily Lamiinae, containing the following species:

- Metaperiaptodes granulatus (Aurivillius, 1908)
- Metaperiaptodes samarensis Breuning, 1974
