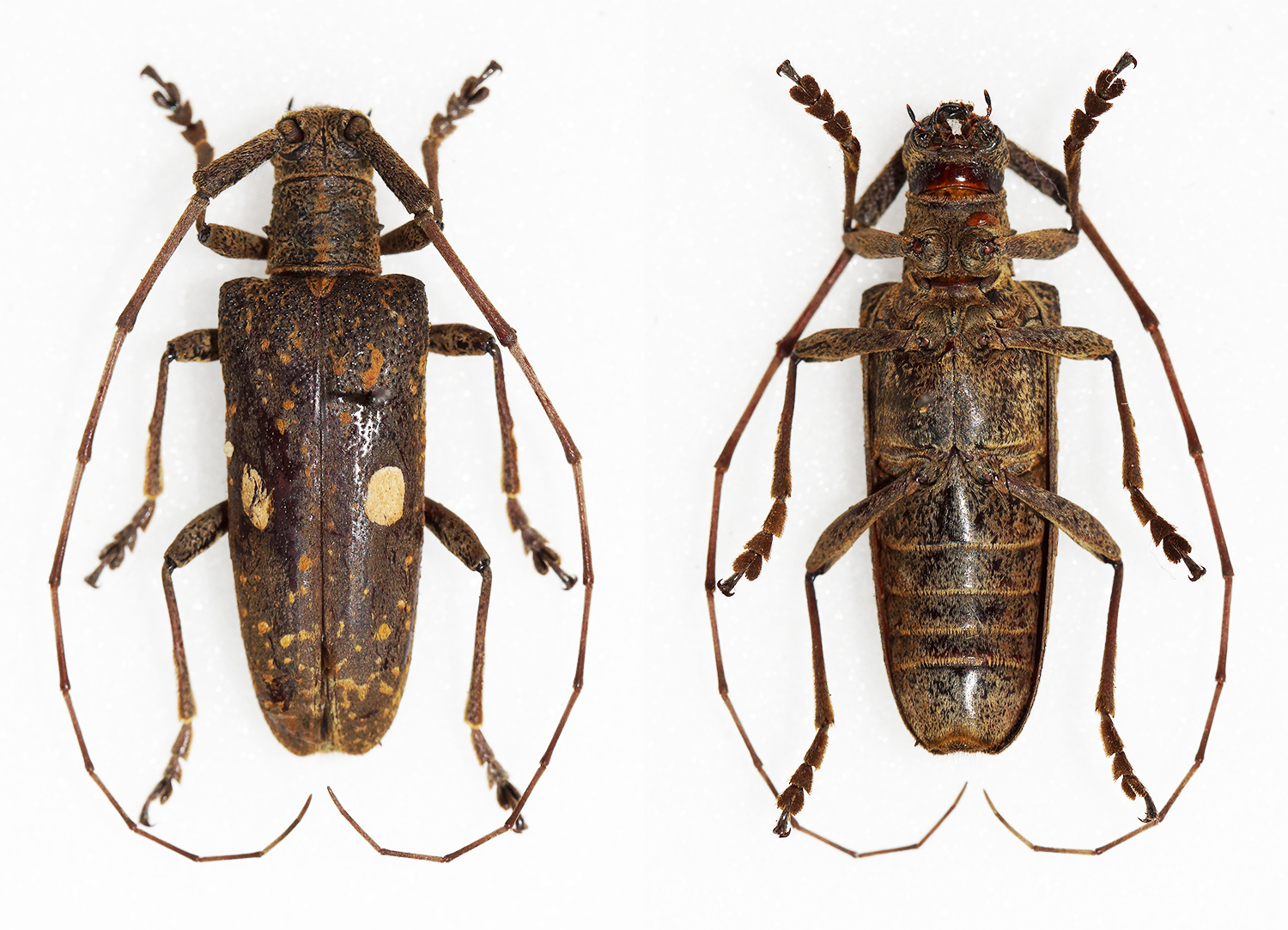
- Paramelanauster bimaculatus

Scientific classification
- Kingdom: Animalia
- Phylum: Arthropoda
- Class: Insecta
- Order: Coleoptera
- Suborder: Polyphaga
- Infraorder: Cucujiformia
- Family: Cerambycidae
- Tribe: Lamiini
- Genus: Paramelanauster

= Paramelanauster =

Genus of beetles

Paramelanauster is a genus of longhorn beetles of the subfamily Lamiinae, containing the following species:

- Paramelanauster bimaculatus Breuning, 1936
- Paramelanauster flavosparsus Breuning, 1936
- Paramelanauster variegatus Gressitt, 1940
