= Pseudothestus =

Scientific classification
- Kingdom: Animalia
- Phylum: Arthropoda
- Class: Insecta
- Order: Coleoptera
- Suborder: Polyphaga
- Infraorder: Cucujiformia
- Family: Cerambycidae
- Tribe: Lamiini
- Genus: Pseudothestus; Breuning, 1943
- Species: P. niveovittatus

Binomial name
- Pseudothestus niveovittatus (Aurivillius, 1910)

Genus of beetles

Pseudothestus is a monotypic beetle genus in the family Cerambycidae described by Stephan von Breuning in 1943. Its only species, Pseudothestus niveovittatus, was described by Per Olof Christopher Aurivillius in 1910.
