= Parhaplothrix =

Scientific classification
- Kingdom: Animalia
- Phylum: Arthropoda
- Clade: Pancrustacea
- Class: Insecta
- Order: Coleoptera
- Suborder: Polyphaga
- Infraorder: Cucujiformia
- Family: Cerambycidae
- Tribe: Lamiini
- Genus: Parhaplothrix; Breuning, 1935

Synonyms
- Parhoplothrix Breuning, 1944 (Lapsus calami)

Genus of beetles

Parhaplothrix is a genus of longhorn beetles of the subfamily Lamiinae, containing the following species:

- Parhaplothrix margaretae Gilmour, 1947
- Parhaplothrix strandi Breuning, 1935
- Parhaplothrix sulphureus Breuning, 1954
- Parhaplothrix szetschuanicus Breuning, 1935
