= Xoes =

Scientific classification
- Domain: Eukaryota
- Kingdom: Animalia
- Phylum: Arthropoda
- Class: Insecta
- Order: Coleoptera
- Suborder: Polyphaga
- Infraorder: Cucujiformia
- Family: Cerambycidae
- Tribe: Monochamini
- Genus: Xoes; Pascoe, 1865
- Species: X. egeria

Binomial name
- Xoes egeria Pascoe, 1866

Genus of beetles

Xoes is a genus of longhorned beetles in the family Cerambycidae. This genus has a single species, Xoes egeria, found in Indonesia and Malaysia.
