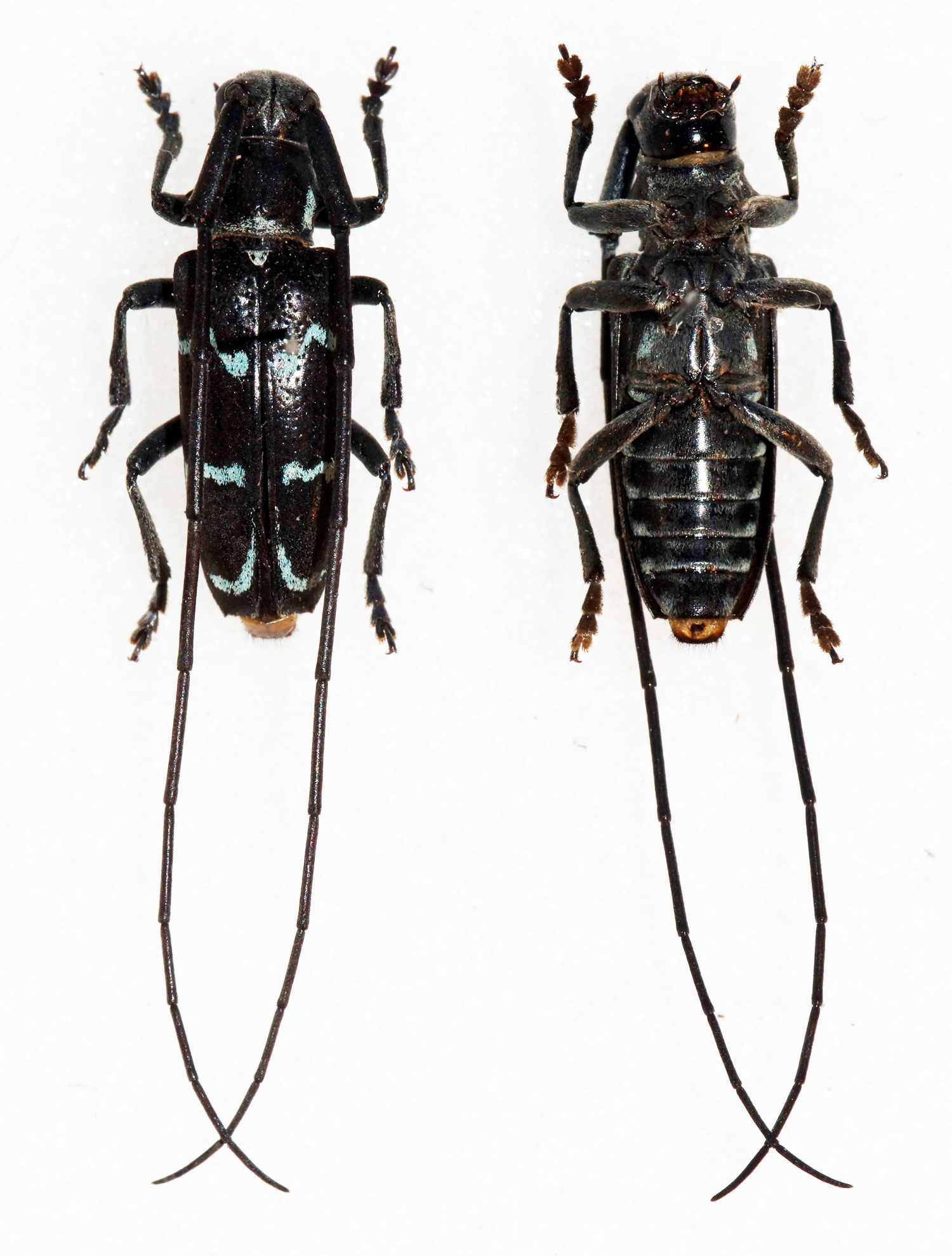

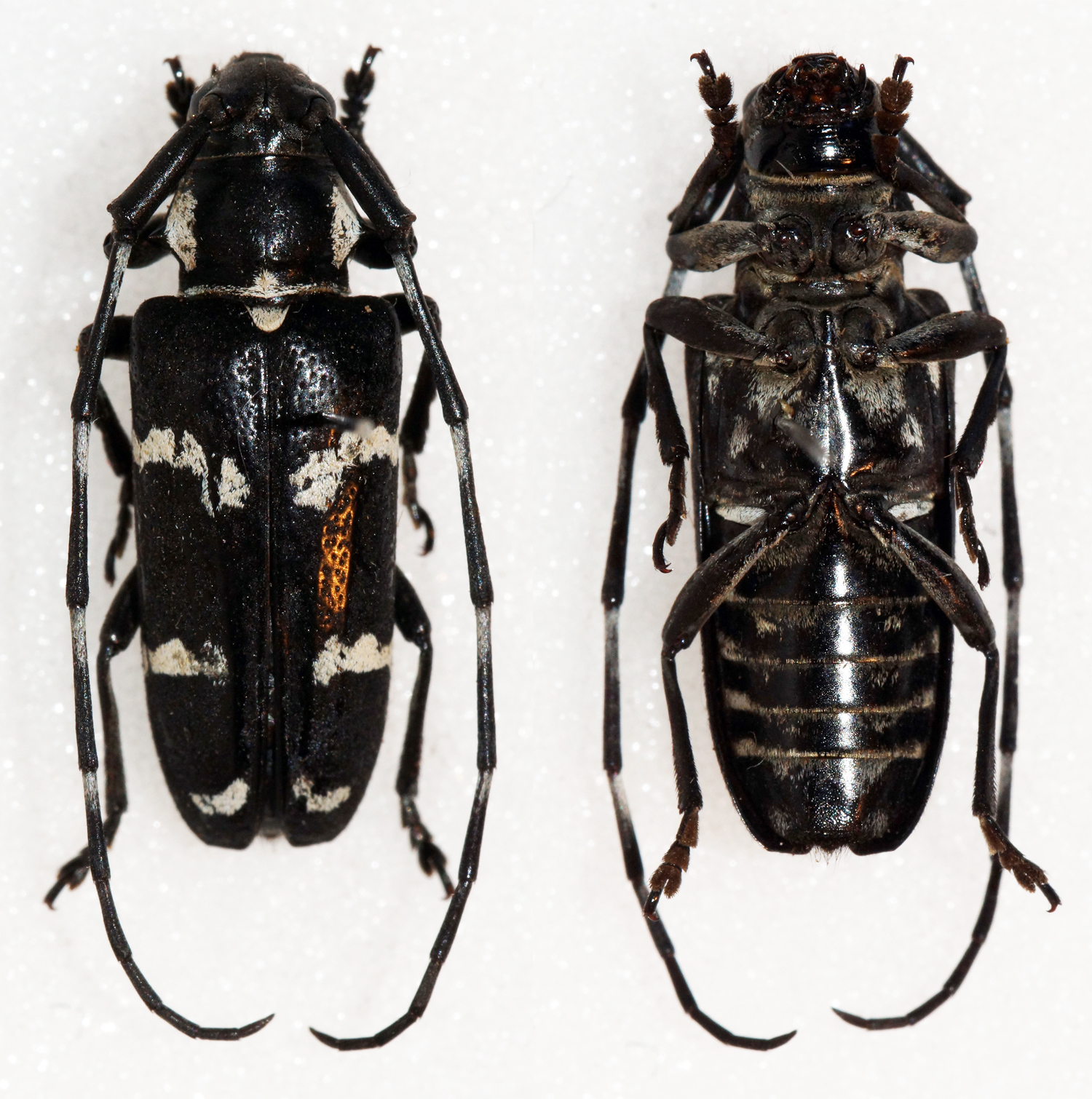

Scientific classification
- Kingdom: Animalia
- Phylum: Arthropoda
- Class: Insecta
- Order: Coleoptera
- Suborder: Polyphaga
- Infraorder: Cucujiformia
- Family: Cerambycidae
- Tribe: Lamiini
- Genus: Cyriotasiastes; Heller, 1924
- Species: C. rhetenor

Binomial name
- Cyriotasiastes rhetenor (Newman, 1842)

= Cyriotasiastes =

Genus of beetles

Cyriotasiastes rhetenor is a species of beetle in the family Cerambycidae, and the only species in the genus Cyriotasiastes. It was described by Newman in 1842.
