= Docolamia =

Scientific classification
- Kingdom: Animalia
- Phylum: Arthropoda
- Class: Insecta
- Order: Coleoptera
- Suborder: Polyphaga
- Infraorder: Cucujiformia
- Family: Cerambycidae
- Tribe: Lamiini
- Genus: Docolamia; Breuning, 1944
- Species: D. incisa

Binomial name
- Docolamia incisa (Aurivillius, 1916)

Genus of beetles

Docolamia is a beetle genus in the family Cerambycidae described by Stephan von Breuning in 1944. Its single species, Docolamia incisa, was described by Per Olof Christopher Aurivillius in 1916.
