= Cyanagapanthia =

Scientific classification
- Kingdom: Animalia
- Phylum: Arthropoda
- Class: Insecta
- Order: Coleoptera
- Suborder: Polyphaga
- Infraorder: Cucujiformia
- Family: Cerambycidae
- Tribe: Lamiini
- Genus: Cyanagapanthia

Genus of beetles

Cyanagapanthia is a genus of longhorn beetles of the subfamily Lamiinae, containing the following species:

- Cyanagapanthia aurecens Wang & Zheng, 2002
- Cyanagapanthia bicolor Breuning, 1968
