= Laelida antennata =

Scientific classification
- Kingdom: Animalia
- Phylum: Arthropoda
- Class: Insecta
- Order: Coleoptera
- Suborder: Polyphaga
- Infraorder: Cucujiformia
- Family: Cerambycidae
- Genus: Laelida
- Species: L. antennata

Binomial name
- Laelida antennata Pascoe, 1866

Species of beetle

Laelida antennata is a species of beetle in the family Cerambycidae. It was described by Francis Polkinghorne Pascoe in 1866. It is known from Singapore, Borneo and Malaysia.
