= Teocchiana =

Scientific classification
- Kingdom: Animalia
- Phylum: Arthropoda
- Class: Insecta
- Order: Coleoptera
- Suborder: Polyphaga
- Infraorder: Cucujiformia
- Family: Cerambycidae
- Tribe: Lamiini
- Genus: Teocchiana; Jiroux, Garreau, Bentanachs & Prévost, 2014
- Species: T. pallida

Binomial name
- Teocchiana pallida (Aurivillius, 1924)

Genus of beetles

Teocchiana is a monotypic beetle genus in the family Cerambycidae described by Eric Jiroux, Philippe Garreau, Joan Bentanachs and Patrick Prévost in 2014. Its only species, Teocchiana pallida, was described by Per Olof Christopher Aurivillius in 1924.
