= Coscinesthes salicis =

Scientific classification
- Kingdom: Animalia
- Phylum: Arthropoda
- Class: Insecta
- Order: Coleoptera
- Suborder: Polyphaga
- Infraorder: Cucujiformia
- Family: Cerambycidae
- Genus: Coscinesthes
- Species: C. salicis

Binomial name
- Coscinesthes salicis Gressitt, 1951

Synonyms
- Hoplothrix foveatus Chiang & Li, 1984

Species of beetle

Coscinesthes salicis is a species of beetle in the family Cerambycidae. It was described by Gressitt in 1951. It is known from China.
