= Docohammus =

Scientific classification
- Kingdom: Animalia
- Phylum: Arthropoda
- Class: Insecta
- Order: Coleoptera
- Suborder: Polyphaga
- Infraorder: Cucujiformia
- Family: Cerambycidae
- Tribe: Lamiini
- Genus: Docohammus

Genus of beetles

Docohammus is a genus of longhorn beetles of the subfamily Lamiinae, containing the following species:

- Docohammus bennigseni Aurivillius, 1908
- Docohammus flavescens Breuning, 1938
- Docohamus orientalis Breuning, 1986
