= Anameromorpha metallica =

Scientific classification
- Kingdom: Animalia
- Phylum: Arthropoda
- Class: Insecta
- Order: Coleoptera
- Suborder: Polyphaga
- Infraorder: Cucujiformia
- Family: Cerambycidae
- Genus: Anameromorpha
- Species: A. metallica

Binomial name
- Anameromorpha metallica Pic, 1923

Species of beetle

Anameromorpha metallica is a species of beetle in the family Cerambycidae. It was described by Maurice Pic in 1923. It is known from Borneo, Vietnam and Laos.
