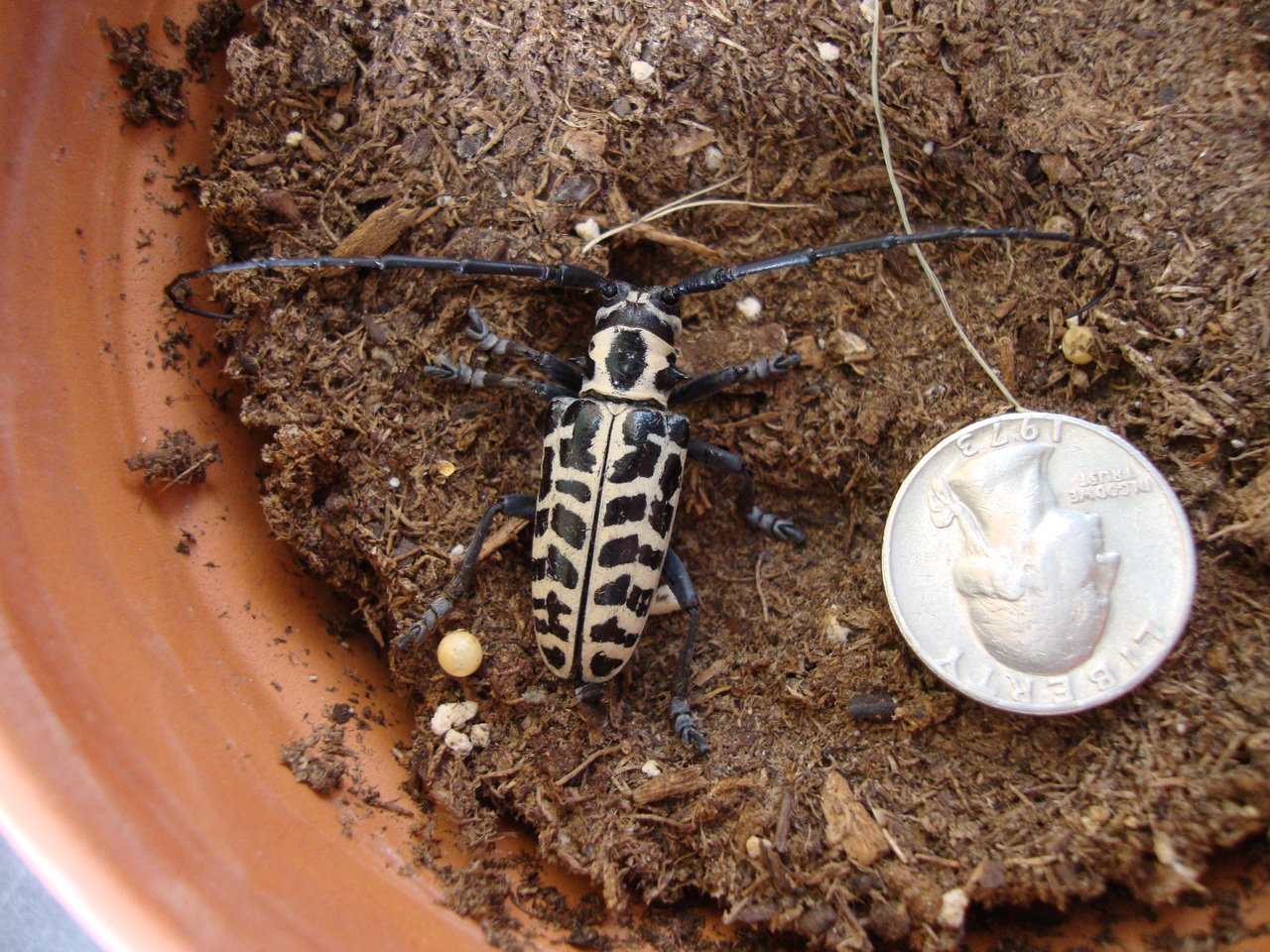
- Cottonwood borer next to quarter for size reference

Scientific classification
- Kingdom: Animalia
- Phylum: Arthropoda
- Clade: Pancrustacea
- Class: Insecta
- Order: Coleoptera
- Suborder: Polyphaga
- Infraorder: Cucujiformia
- Family: Cerambycidae
- Subfamily: Lamiinae
- Tribe: Lamiini
- Genus: Plectrodera; Dejean, 1837
- Species: P. scalator

Binomial name
- Plectrodera scalator (Fabricius, 1792)

= Cottonwood borer =

Species of beetle

The cottonwood borer (Plectrodera scalator) is a species of longhorn beetle found in the United States east of the Rocky Mountains that feeds on cottonwood trees. It is one of the largest beetles in North America, with lengths reaching 40 millimetres (1.6 in) and widths, 12 mm (0.47 in). It is the only species in the genus Plectrodera.

== Description ==
The adult cottonwood borer is a large longhorn beetle with a black-and-white coloration and black antennae as long or longer than the body. The white portions are due to microscopic masses of hair. The larvae have legless, cylindrical, creamy-white bodies with a brown-to-black head and grow up to 38 millimetres (1.5 in) long.

== Life cycle ==
The female cottonwood borer will chew small pits in the base of the tree in which to lay her eggs. The larvae can take up to two years to mature, after which they pupate in a root below ground level for approximately three weeks. Once metamorphosis has completed, the now-adult chews its way out of the root and digs up to the surface.

== Environmental impact ==
Although larvae can kill young trees by girdling them, infested mature trees are usually not seriously injured. The larvae can also structurally weaken a young tree, which is then more susceptible to falling over in high winds. Adults feed on leaf stems and the bark of tender shoots, occasionally causing flagging.
