= Cribrochamus cribrosus =

Scientific classification
- Domain: Eukaryota
- Kingdom: Animalia
- Phylum: Arthropoda
- Class: Insecta
- Order: Coleoptera
- Suborder: Polyphaga
- Infraorder: Cucujiformia
- Family: Cerambycidae
- Tribe: Lamiini
- Genus: Cribrochamus; Dillon & Dillon, 1959
- Species: C. cribrosus

Binomial name
- Cribrochamus cribrosus (Lameere, 1893)

Synonyms
- Monohammus cribrosus Lameere, 1893; Monochamus cribrosus (Lameere, 1893)

Species of beetle

Cribrochamus cribrosus is a species of beetle in the family Cerambycidae, and the sole member of the genus Cribrochamus. It was described by Lameere in 1893, originally as "Monohammus" cribrosus.
