= Lochmodocerus =

Scientific classification
- Kingdom: Animalia
- Phylum: Arthropoda
- Class: Insecta
- Order: Coleoptera
- Suborder: Polyphaga
- Infraorder: Cucujiformia
- Family: Cerambycidae
- Genus: Lochmodocerus
- Species: L. antennatus

Binomial name
- Lochmodocerus antennatus Burne, 1984

Genus of beetles

Lochmodocerus antennatus is a species of beetle in the family Cerambycidae, and the only species in the genus Lochmodocerus. It was described by Burne in 1984.

Lochmodocerus antennatus was discovered in Chiapas, Mexico, and is characterized by having conspicuous zones of long, erect setae on the basal portion of some of the segments of the antennae in both sexes.
