= Pseudanhammus =

Scientific classification
- Kingdom: Animalia
- Phylum: Arthropoda
- Class: Insecta
- Order: Coleoptera
- Suborder: Polyphaga
- Infraorder: Cucujiformia
- Family: Cerambycidae
- Genus: Pseudanhammus
- Species: P. keili

Binomial name
- Pseudanhammus keili Ritsema, 1889

Genus of beetles

Pseudanhammus keili is a species of beetle in the family Cerambycidae, and the only species in the genus Pseudanhammus. It was described by Coenraad Ritsema in 1889.
