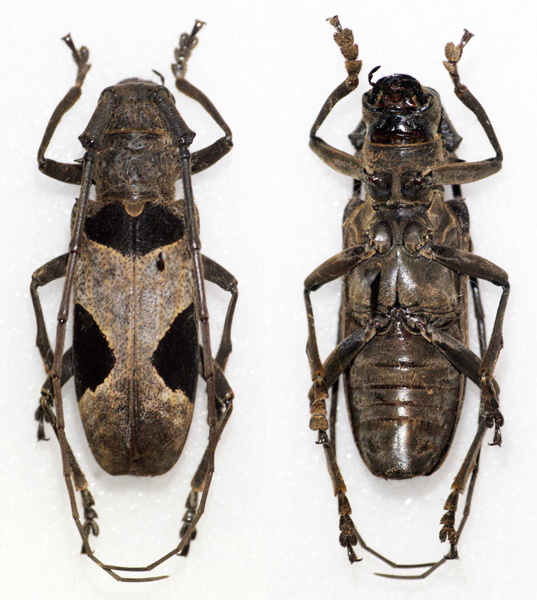

Scientific classification
- Kingdom: Animalia
- Phylum: Arthropoda
- Class: Insecta
- Order: Coleoptera
- Suborder: Polyphaga
- Infraorder: Cucujiformia
- Family: Cerambycidae
- Genus: Odontolamia
- Species: O. sellata

Binomial name
- Odontolamia sellata (Harold, 1879)

= Odontolamia =

Genus of beetles

Odontolamia sellata is a species of beetle in the family Cerambycidae, and the only species in the genus Odontolamia. It was described by Harold in 1879.
