= Pseudanamera =

Scientific classification
- Kingdom: Animalia
- Phylum: Arthropoda
- Class: Insecta
- Order: Coleoptera
- Suborder: Polyphaga
- Infraorder: Cucujiformia
- Family: Cerambycidae
- Genus: Pseudanamera
- Species: P. fulvomaculata

Binomial name
- Pseudanamera fulvomaculata Breuning, 1935

Genus of beetles

Pseudanamera fulvomaculata is a species of beetle in the family Cerambycidae, and the only species in the genus Pseudanamera. It was described by Breuning in 1935.
