= Pseudangulatus =

Scientific classification
- Kingdom: Animalia
- Phylum: Arthropoda
- Class: Insecta
- Order: Coleoptera
- Suborder: Polyphaga
- Infraorder: Cucujiformia
- Family: Cerambycidae
- Genus: Pseudangulatus
- Species: P. comatus

Binomial name
- Pseudangulatus comatus Dillon & Dillon, 1959

Genus of beetles

Pseudangulatus comatus is a species of beetle in the family Cerambycidae, and the only species in the genus Pseudangulatus. It was described by Dillon and Dillon in 1959.
