= Pseudobixadus =

Scientific classification
- Kingdom: Animalia
- Phylum: Arthropoda
- Class: Insecta
- Order: Coleoptera
- Suborder: Polyphaga
- Infraorder: Cucujiformia
- Family: Cerambycidae
- Genus: Pseudobixadus
- Species: P. marshalli

Binomial name
- Pseudobixadus marshalli Breuning, 1936

Genus of beetles

Pseudobixadus marshalli is a species of beetle in the family Cerambycidae, and the only species in the genus Pseudobixadus. It was described by Stephan von Breuning in 1936.
