= Paracyriothasastes =

Scientific classification
- Kingdom: Animalia
- Phylum: Arthropoda
- Class: Insecta
- Order: Coleoptera
- Suborder: Polyphaga
- Infraorder: Cucujiformia
- Family: Cerambycidae
- Genus: Paracyriothasastes
- Species: P. marmoreus

Binomial name
- Paracyriothasastes marmoreus (Pascoe, 1857)

Genus of beetles

Paracyriothasastes marmoreus is a species of beetle in the family Cerambycidae, and the only species in the genus Paracyriothasastes. It was described by Pascoe in 1857.
