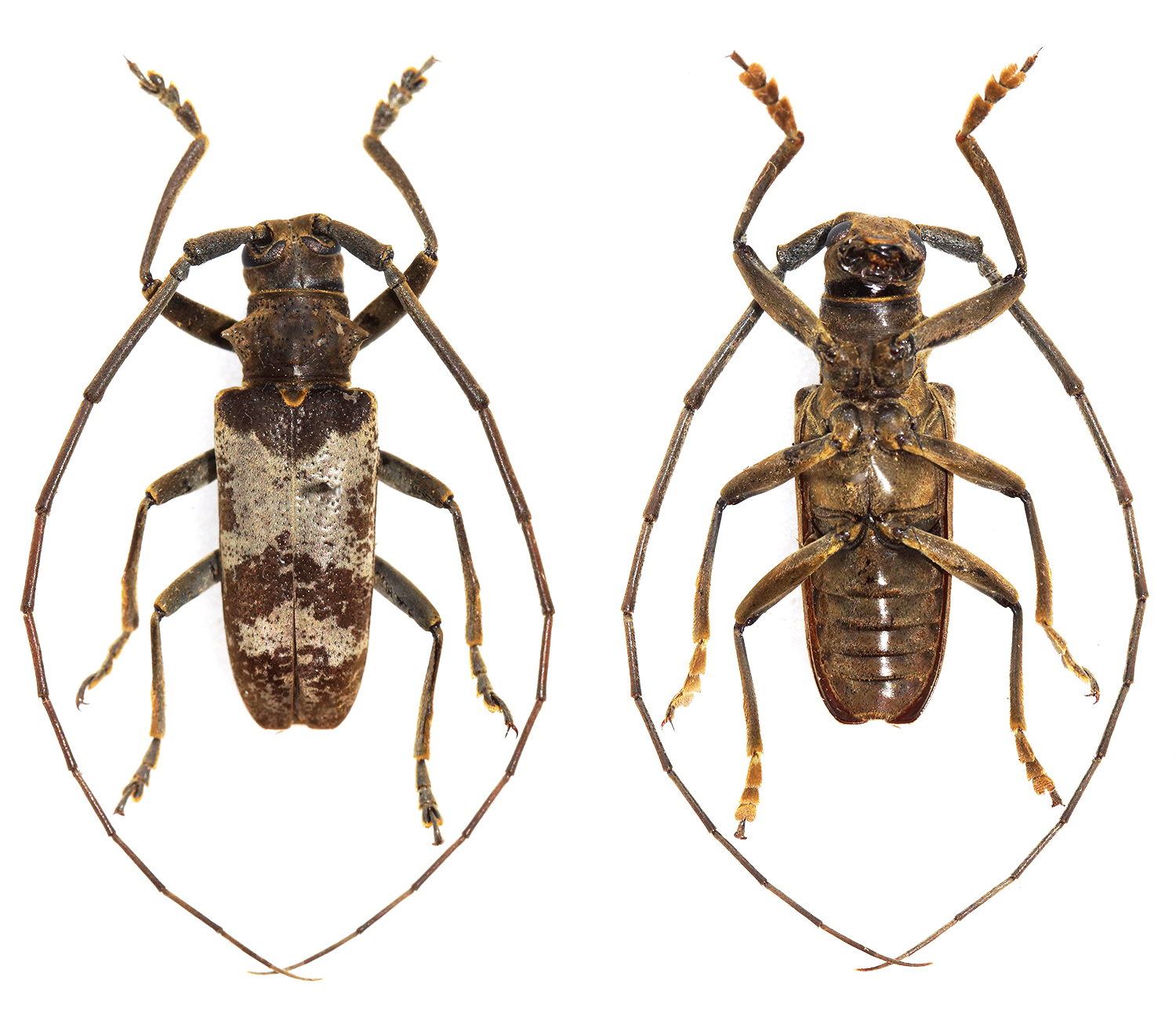

Scientific classification
- Kingdom: Animalia
- Phylum: Arthropoda
- Clade: Pancrustacea
- Class: Insecta
- Order: Coleoptera
- Suborder: Polyphaga
- Infraorder: Cucujiformia
- Family: Cerambycidae
- Genus: Monochamus
- Species: M. ruspator

Binomial name
- Monochamus ruspator (Fabricius, 1781)

Synonyms
- Cerambyx ruspator (Fabricius) Gmelin, 1790; Lamia nubifer Gyllenhal, 1817; Lamia ruspator Fabricius, 1781; Monochamus gabonicus Thomson, 1858; Murzinia karatauensis Lazarev, 2011

= Monochamus ruspator =

Species of beetle

Monochamus ruspator is a species of beetle in the family Cerambycidae. It was described by Johan Christian Fabricius in 1781, originally under the genus Lamia. It has a wide distribution throughout Africa, and is also present in Kazakhstan.

The species Murzinia karatauensis was described from Kazakhstan in 2011, but was later determined to be a synonym of Monochamus ruspator. It was found in Kzyl-Orda Region, Chiili District, North Karatau Ridge, Daut Mountain.

== Subspecies ==
- Monochamus ruspator ruandae Breuning, 1955
- Monochamus ruspator ruspator (Fabricius, 1781)

== Varietas ==
- Monochamus ruspator var. basalis (Chevrolat, 1857)
- Monochamus ruspator var. dentipes (Gyllenhal, 1817)

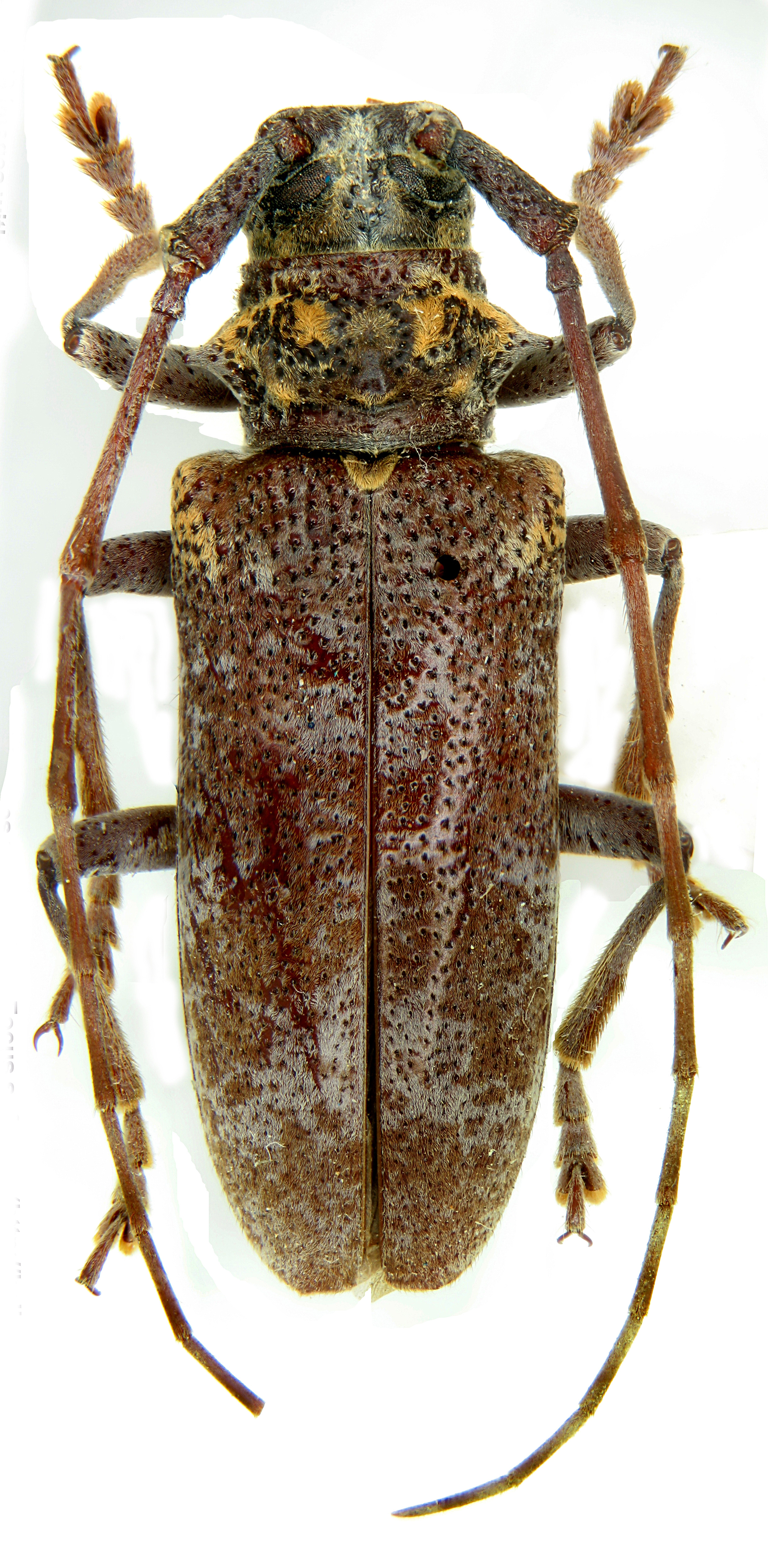
Murzinia karatauensis Lazarev, 2011 (Holotype, female)
