= Eudihammus =

Scientific classification
- Kingdom: Animalia
- Phylum: Arthropoda
- Class: Insecta
- Order: Coleoptera
- Suborder: Polyphaga
- Infraorder: Cucujiformia
- Family: Cerambycidae
- Genus: Eudihammus
- Species: E. granulatus

Binomial name
- Eudihammus granulatus (Gahan, 1906)

Genus of beetles

Eudihammus granulatus is a species of beetle in the family Cerambycidae, and the only species in the genus Eudihammus. It was described by Gahan in 1906.
