= Neoxenicotela =

Scientific classification
- Kingdom: Animalia
- Phylum: Arthropoda
- Class: Insecta
- Order: Coleoptera
- Suborder: Polyphaga
- Infraorder: Cucujiformia
- Family: Cerambycidae
- Genus: Neoxenicotela
- Species: N. mausoni

Binomial name
- Neoxenicotela mausoni Breuning, 1947

Genus of beetles

Neoxenicotela mausoni is a species of beetle in the family Cerambycidae, and the only species in the genus Neoxenicotela. It was described by Breuning in 1947.
