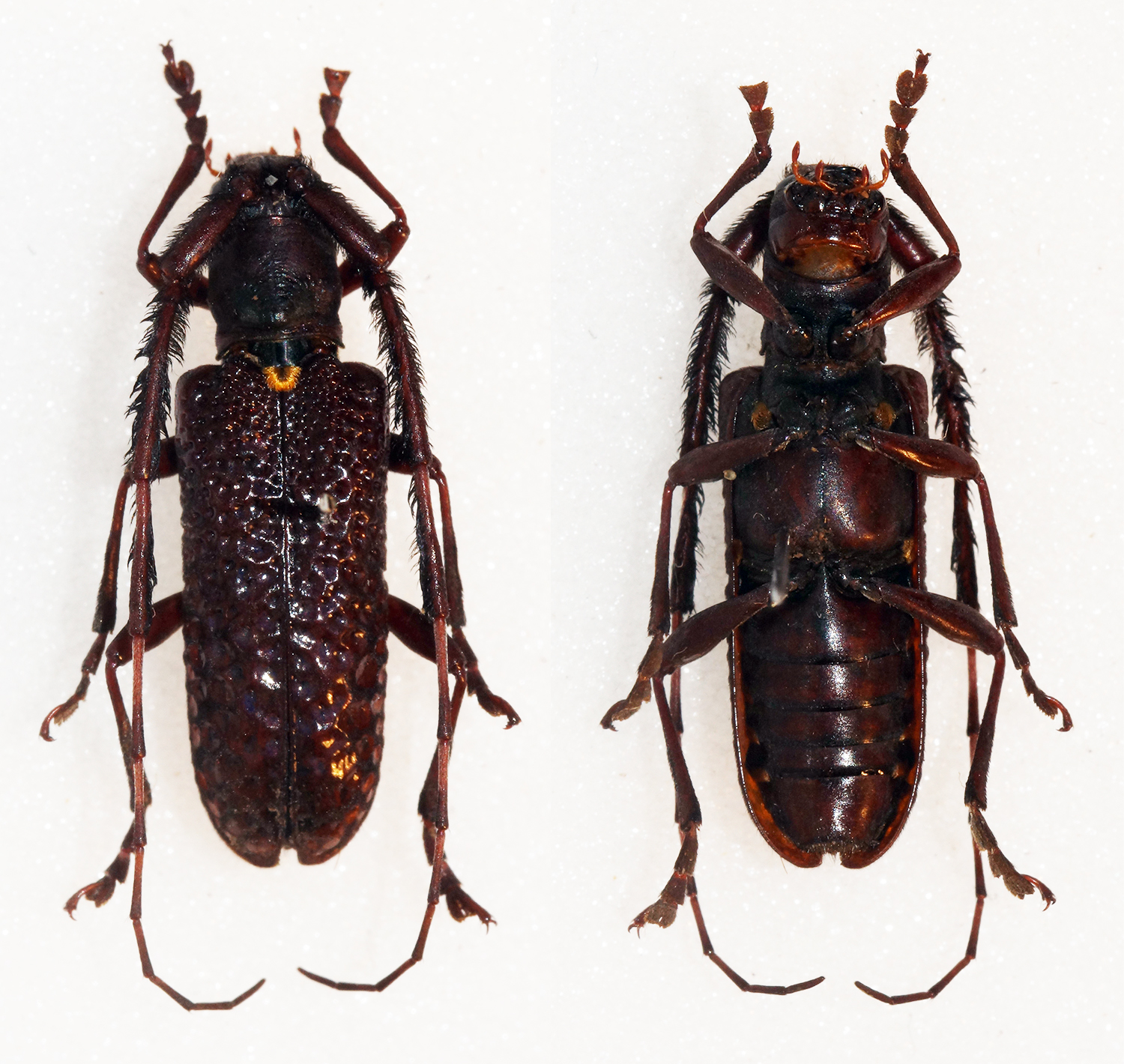

Scientific classification
- Kingdom: Animalia
- Phylum: Arthropoda
- Class: Insecta
- Order: Coleoptera
- Suborder: Polyphaga
- Infraorder: Cucujiformia
- Family: Cerambycidae
- Genus: Cribragapanthia
- Species: C. scutellata

Binomial name
- Cribragapanthia scutellata Pic, 1903

= Cribragapanthia =

Genus of beetles

Cribragapanthia scutellata is a species of beetle in the family Cerambycidae, and the only species in the genus Cribragapanthia. It was described by Maurice Pic in 1903.
