= Trichacalolepta =

Scientific classification
- Kingdom: Animalia
- Phylum: Arthropoda
- Class: Insecta
- Order: Coleoptera
- Suborder: Polyphaga
- Infraorder: Cucujiformia
- Family: Cerambycidae
- Genus: Trichacalolepta
- Species: T. mouhoti

Binomial name
- Trichacalolepta mouhoti Breuning, 1982

Genus of beetles

Trichacalolepta mouhoti is a species of beetle in the family Cerambycidae, and the only species in the genus Trichacalolepta. It was described by Stephan von Breuning in 1982.
