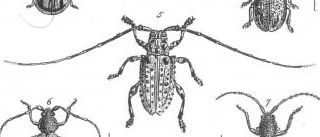

Scientific classification
- Kingdom: Animalia
- Phylum: Arthropoda
- Class: Insecta
- Order: Coleoptera
- Suborder: Polyphaga
- Infraorder: Cucujiformia
- Family: Cerambycidae
- Genus: Callipyrga
- Species: C. turrita

Binomial name
- Callipyrga turrita Newman, 1842

= Callipyrga =

Genus of beetles

Callipyrga turrita is a species of beetle in the family Cerambycidae, and the only species in the genus Callipyrga. It was described by Edward Newman in 1842 using a specimen obtained by Rupert Kirk at Woodside near Sydney. This species is endemic to coastal eastern Australia from Townsville in Queensland down to Glenmore in New South Wales. The adult beetles are attracted to light and have been collected on Geijera parviflora and Flindersia xanthoxyla.
