= Agniopsis =

Scientific classification
- Kingdom: Animalia
- Phylum: Arthropoda
- Class: Insecta
- Order: Coleoptera
- Suborder: Polyphaga
- Infraorder: Cucujiformia
- Family: Cerambycidae
- Genus: Agniopsis
- Species: A. flavovittatus

Binomial name
- Agniopsis flavovittatus Breuning, 1936

Genus of beetles

Agniopsis flavovittatus is a species of beetle in the family Cerambycidae, and the only species in the genus Agniopsis. It was described by Breuning in 1936.
