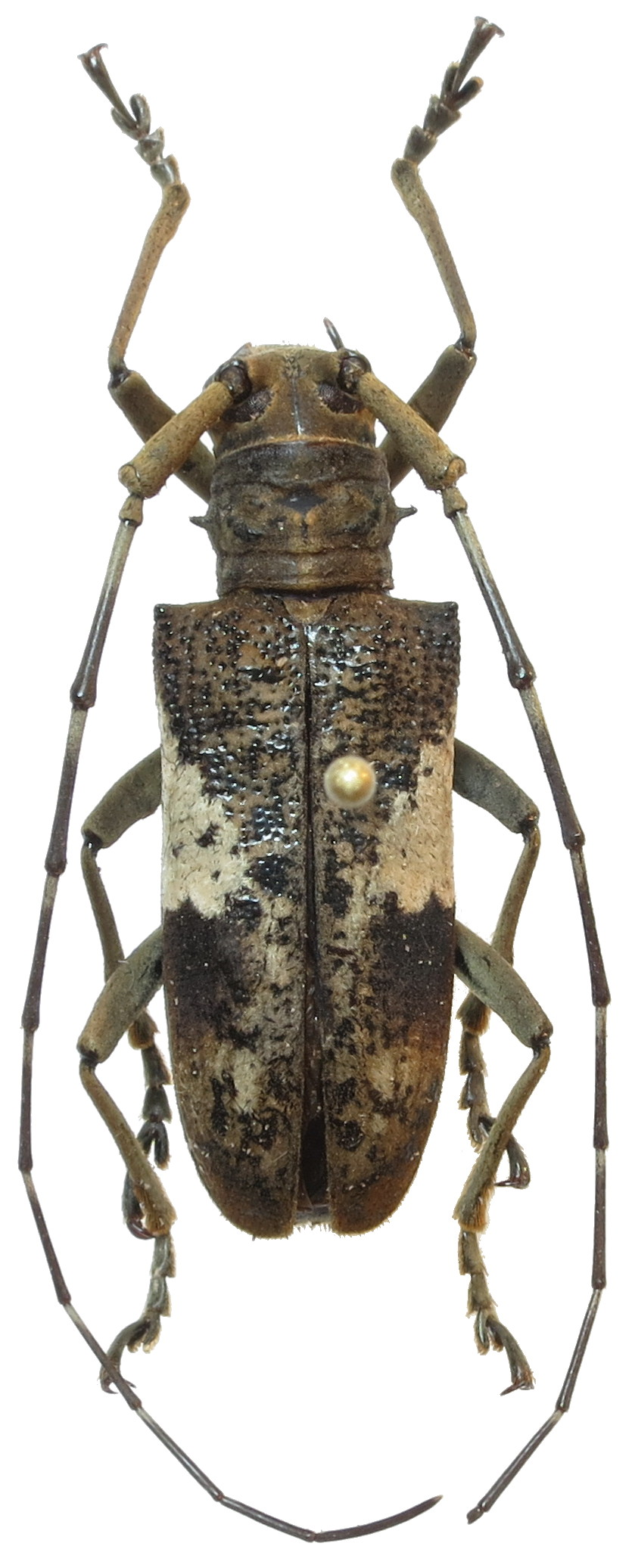
- P. marcipor from Philippines

Scientific classification
- Kingdom: Animalia
- Phylum: Arthropoda
- Class: Insecta
- Order: Coleoptera
- Suborder: Polyphaga
- Infraorder: Cucujiformia
- Family: Cerambycidae
- Genus: Paranhammus
- Species: P. marcipor

Binomial name
- Paranhammus marcipor (Newman, 1842)

= Paranhammus =

Genus of beetles

Paranhammus marcipor is a species of beetle in the family Cerambycidae, and the only species in the genus Paranhammus. It was described by Newman in 1842.
