= Pseudoxenicotela =

Scientific classification
- Kingdom: Animalia
- Phylum: Arthropoda
- Class: Insecta
- Order: Coleoptera
- Suborder: Polyphaga
- Infraorder: Cucujiformia
- Family: Cerambycidae
- Genus: Pseudoxenicotela
- Species: P. ashantica

Binomial name
- Pseudoxenicotela ashantica Breuning, 1959

Genus of beetles

Pseudoxenicotela ashantica is a species of beetle in the family Cerambycidae, and the only species in the genus Pseudoxenicotela. It was described by Stephan von Breuning in 1959.
