= Sternorsidis =

Scientific classification
- Kingdom: Animalia
- Phylum: Arthropoda
- Class: Insecta
- Order: Coleoptera
- Suborder: Polyphaga
- Infraorder: Cucujiformia
- Family: Cerambycidae
- Genus: Sternorsidis
- Species: S. brunnea

Binomial name
- Sternorsidis brunnea Breuning, 1959

Genus of beetles

Sternorsidis brunnea is a species of beetle in the family Cerambycidae, and the only species in the genus Sternorsidis. It was described by Stephan von Breuning in 1959.
