= Prodomitia =

Scientific classification
- Kingdom: Animalia
- Phylum: Arthropoda
- Class: Insecta
- Order: Coleoptera
- Suborder: Polyphaga
- Infraorder: Cucujiformia
- Family: Cerambycidae
- Genus: Prodomitia
- Species: P. squamigera

Binomial name
- Prodomitia squamigera Jordan, 1894

Genus of beetles

Prodomitia is a monotypic beetle genus in the family Cerambycidae. Its only species is Prodomitia squamigera. Both the genus and species were described by Karl Jordan in 1894.
