= Mimotriammatus =

Scientific classification
- Kingdom: Animalia
- Phylum: Arthropoda
- Class: Insecta
- Order: Coleoptera
- Suborder: Polyphaga
- Infraorder: Cucujiformia
- Family: Cerambycidae
- Genus: Mimotriammatus
- Species: M. nigrosignatus

Binomial name
- Mimotriammatus nigrosignatus Breuning, 1972

Genus of beetles

Mimotriammatus nigrosignatus is a species of beetle in the family Cerambycidae, and the only species in the genus Mimotriammatus. It was described by Breuning in 1972.
