= Cesonium =

Scientific classification
- Kingdom: Animalia
- Phylum: Arthropoda
- Class: Insecta
- Order: Coleoptera
- Suborder: Polyphaga
- Infraorder: Cucujiformia
- Family: Cerambycidae
- Genus: Cesonium; Dillon & Dillon, 1959
- Species: C. cribellum

Binomial name
- Cesonium cribellum (Jordan, 1903)

Synonyms
- Monochamus cribellum Jordan, 1903; Monochamus cribrellus Breuning, 1944 (misspelling)

Species of beetle

Cesonium cribellum is a species of beetle in the family Cerambycidae, and the sole member of the genus Cesonium. It was described by Karl Jordan in 1903. It is known from Cameroon.
