= Pareutaenia =

Scientific classification
- Kingdom: Animalia
- Phylum: Arthropoda
- Class: Insecta
- Order: Coleoptera
- Suborder: Polyphaga
- Infraorder: Cucujiformia
- Family: Cerambycidae
- Subfamily: Lamiinae
- Genus: Pareutaenia

Genus of beetles

Pareutaenia is a genus of longhorn beetles of the subfamily Lamiinae, containing the following species:

- Pareutaenia arnaudi Breuning, 1962
- Pareutaenia flavostellata Breuning, 1948
