= Parapolytretus =

Scientific classification
- Kingdom: Animalia
- Phylum: Arthropoda
- Class: Insecta
- Order: Coleoptera
- Suborder: Polyphaga
- Infraorder: Cucujiformia
- Family: Cerambycidae
- Genus: Parapolytretus
- Species: P. rugosus

Binomial name
- Parapolytretus rugosus (Matsushita, 1933)

Genus of beetles

Parapolytretus rugosus is a species of beetle in the family Cerambycidae, and the only species in the genus Parapolytretus. It was described by Matsushita in 1933.
