= Eusyntheta =

Scientific classification
- Kingdom: Animalia
- Phylum: Arthropoda
- Class: Insecta
- Order: Coleoptera
- Suborder: Polyphaga
- Infraorder: Cucujiformia
- Family: Cerambycidae
- Genus: Eusyntheta
- Species: E. brevicornis

Binomial name
- Eusyntheta brevicornis Bates, 1889

Genus of beetles

Eusyntheta brevicornis is a species of beetle in the family Cerambycidae, and the only species in the genus Eusyntheta. It was described by Bates in 1889.
