= Ippitoides =

Scientific classification
- Kingdom: Animalia
- Phylum: Arthropoda
- Class: Insecta
- Order: Coleoptera
- Suborder: Polyphaga
- Infraorder: Cucujiformia
- Family: Cerambycidae
- Genus: Ippitoides
- Species: I. uniformis

Binomial name
- Ippitoides uniformis Dillon & Dillon, 1959

Genus of beetles

Ippitoides uniformis is a species of beetle in the family Cerambycidae, and the only species in the genus Ippitoides. It was described by Dillon and Dillon in 1959.
