= Mimopsacothea =

Scientific classification
- Kingdom: Animalia
- Phylum: Arthropoda
- Class: Insecta
- Order: Coleoptera
- Suborder: Polyphaga
- Infraorder: Cucujiformia
- Family: Cerambycidae
- Genus: Mimopsacothea
- Species: M. enganensis

Binomial name
- Mimopsacothea enganensis Breuning, 1973

Genus of beetles

Mimopsacothea enganensis is a species of beetle in the family Cerambycidae, and is the only species in the genus Mimopsacothea. It was described by Breuning in 1973.
