= Euoplia =

Scientific classification
- Kingdom: Animalia
- Phylum: Arthropoda
- Class: Insecta
- Order: Coleoptera
- Suborder: Polyphaga
- Infraorder: Cucujiformia
- Family: Cerambycidae
- Genus: Euoplia
- Species: E. polyspila

Binomial name
- Euoplia polyspila Hope, 1939

Genus of beetles

Euoplia polyspila is a species of beetle in the family Cerambycidae, and the only species in the genus Euoplia. It was described by Hope in 1939.
