= Granolamia =

Scientific classification
- Kingdom: Animalia
- Phylum: Arthropoda
- Class: Insecta
- Order: Coleoptera
- Suborder: Polyphaga
- Infraorder: Cucujiformia
- Family: Cerambycidae
- Genus: Granolamia
- Species: G. granulifera

Binomial name
- Granolamia granulifera (Kolbe, 1893)

Genus of beetles

Granolamia granulifera is a species of beetle in the family Cerambycidae, and the only species in the genus Granolamia. It was described by Kolbe in 1893.
