= Stegenodes =

Scientific classification
- Kingdom: Animalia
- Phylum: Arthropoda
- Class: Insecta
- Order: Coleoptera
- Suborder: Polyphaga
- Infraorder: Cucujiformia
- Family: Cerambycidae
- Genus: Stegenodes
- Species: S. ruber

Binomial name
- Stegenodes ruber Breuning, 1942

Genus of beetles

Stegenodes ruber is a species of beetle in the family Cerambycidae, and the only species in the genus Stegenodes. It was described by Stephan von Breuning in 1942.
