= Trichonemophas =

Scientific classification
- Kingdom: Animalia
- Phylum: Arthropoda
- Class: Insecta
- Order: Coleoptera
- Suborder: Polyphaga
- Infraorder: Cucujiformia
- Family: Cerambycidae
- Genus: Trichonemophas
- Species: T. chassoti

Binomial name
- Trichonemophas chassoti Breuning, 1971

Genus of beetles

Trichonemophas chassoti is a species of beetle in the family Cerambycidae, and the only species in the genus Trichonemophas. It was described by Stephan von Breuning in 1971.
