= Trichagnia =

Scientific classification
- Kingdom: Animalia
- Phylum: Arthropoda
- Class: Insecta
- Order: Coleoptera
- Suborder: Polyphaga
- Infraorder: Cucujiformia
- Family: Cerambycidae
- Genus: Trichagnia
- Species: T. fuscomaculata

Binomial name
- Trichagnia fuscomaculata Breuning, 1938

Genus of beetles

Trichagnia fuscomaculata is a species of beetle in the family Cerambycidae, and the only species in the genus Trichagnia. It was described by Stephan von Breuning in 1938.
