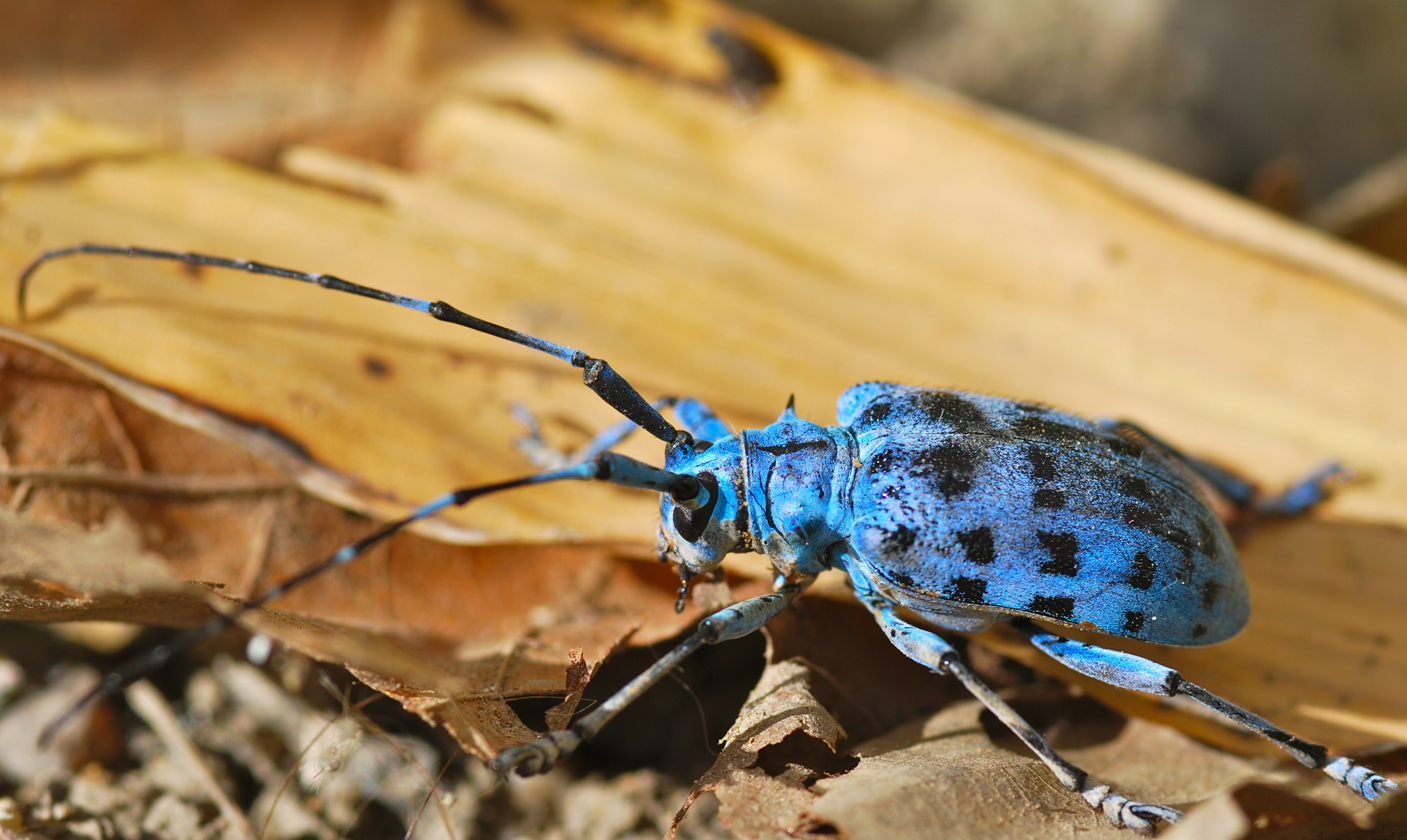

Scientific classification
- Kingdom: Animalia
- Phylum: Arthropoda
- Class: Insecta
- Order: Coleoptera
- Suborder: Polyphaga
- Infraorder: Cucujiformia
- Family: Cerambycidae
- Genus: Pseudomyagrus
- Species: P. waterhousei

Binomial name
- Pseudomyagrus waterhousei (Gahan, 1888)

= Pseudomyagrus =

Genus of beetles

Pseudomyagrus waterhousei is a species of beetle in the family Cerambycidae, and the only species in the genus Pseudomyagrus. It was described by Gahan in 1888.
