= Magninia =

Scientific classification
- Kingdom: Animalia
- Phylum: Arthropoda
- Class: Insecta
- Order: Coleoptera
- Suborder: Polyphaga
- Infraorder: Cucujiformia
- Family: Cerambycidae
- Genus: Magninia
- Species: M. tonkinea

Binomial name
- Magninia tonkinea Clermont, 1932

Genus of beetles

Magninia tonkinea is a species of beetle in the family Cerambycidae, and the only species in the genus Magninia. It was described by Clermont in 1932.
