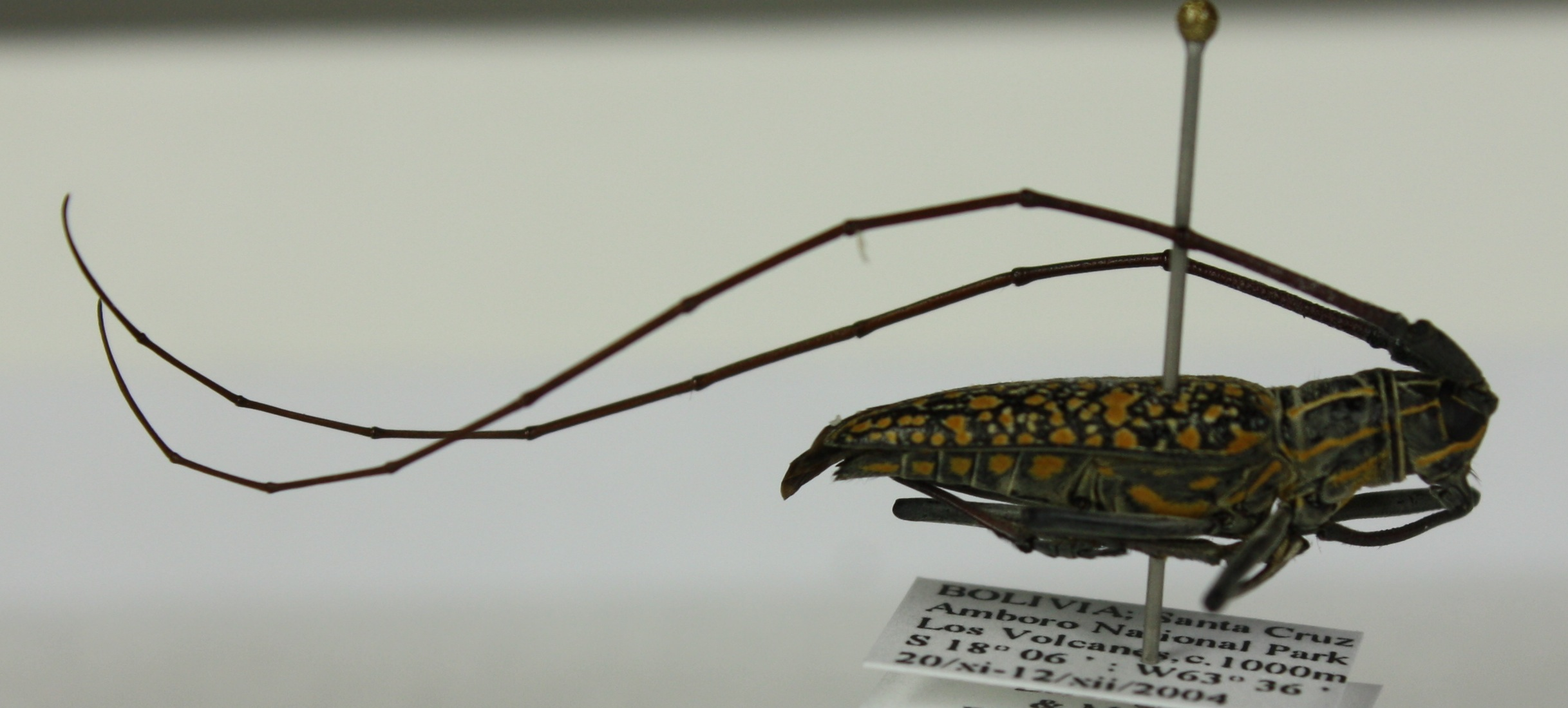

Scientific classification
- Kingdom: Animalia
- Phylum: Arthropoda
- Class: Insecta
- Order: Coleoptera
- Suborder: Polyphaga
- Infraorder: Cucujiformia
- Family: Cerambycidae
- Genus: Pseudotaeniotes
- Species: P. mimus

Binomial name
- Pseudotaeniotes mimus (Dillon & Dillon, 1943)

= Pseudotaeniotes =

Genus of beetles

Pseudotaeniotes mimus is a species of beetle in the family Cerambycidae, and the only species in the genus Pseudotaeniotes. It was described by Dillon and Dillon in 1943.
