= Mimonephelotus =

Scientific classification
- Kingdom: Animalia
- Phylum: Arthropoda
- Class: Insecta
- Order: Coleoptera
- Suborder: Polyphaga
- Infraorder: Cucujiformia
- Family: Cerambycidae
- Genus: Mimonephelotus
- Species: M. flavomarmoratus

Binomial name
- Mimonephelotus flavomarmoratus Breuning, 1940

Genus of beetles

Mimonephelotus flavomarmoratus is a species of beetle in the family Cerambycidae, and the only species in the genus Mimonephelotus. It was described by Breuning in 1940.
