= Oculohammus =

Scientific classification
- Kingdom: Animalia
- Phylum: Arthropoda
- Class: Insecta
- Order: Coleoptera
- Suborder: Polyphaga
- Infraorder: Cucujiformia
- Family: Cerambycidae
- Genus: Oculohammus
- Species: O. densepunctatus

Binomial name
- Oculohammus densepunctatus Breuning & de Jong, 1941

Genus of beetles

Oculohammus densepunctatus is a species of beetle in the family Cerambycidae, and the only species in the genus Oculohammus. It was described by Stephan von Breuning and de Jong in 1941.
