= Cinctohammus =

Scientific classification
- Kingdom: Animalia
- Phylum: Arthropoda
- Class: Insecta
- Order: Coleoptera
- Suborder: Polyphaga
- Infraorder: Cucujiformia
- Family: Cerambycidae
- Genus: Cinctohammus
- Species: C. cinctus

Binomial name
- Cinctohammus cinctus (Jordan, 1903)

Genus of beetles

Cinctohammus cinctus is a species of beetle in the family Cerambycidae, and the only species in the genus Cinctohammus. It was described by Karl Jordan in 1903.
