= Anoplophoroides =

Scientific classification
- Kingdom: Animalia
- Phylum: Arthropoda
- Class: Insecta
- Order: Coleoptera
- Suborder: Polyphaga
- Infraorder: Cucujiformia
- Family: Cerambycidae
- Genus: Anoplophoroides
- Species: A. lumawigi

Binomial name
- Anoplophoroides lumawigi Breuning, 1980

Genus of beetles

Anoplophoroides lumawigi is a species of beetle in the family Cerambycidae, and the only species in the genus Anoplophoroides. It was described by Breuning in 1980.
