= Trichomonochamus =

Scientific classification
- Kingdom: Animalia
- Phylum: Arthropoda
- Class: Insecta
- Order: Coleoptera
- Suborder: Polyphaga
- Infraorder: Cucujiformia
- Family: Cerambycidae
- Genus: Trichomonochamus
- Species: T. basilewskyi

Binomial name
- Trichomonochamus basilewskyi Breuning, 1953

Genus of beetles

Trichomonochamus basilewskyi is a species of beetle in the family Cerambycidae, and the only species in the genus Trichomonochamus. It was described by Stephan von Breuning in 1953.
