= Falsodihammus =

Scientific classification
- Kingdom: Animalia
- Phylum: Arthropoda
- Class: Insecta
- Order: Coleoptera
- Suborder: Polyphaga
- Infraorder: Cucujiformia
- Family: Cerambycidae
- Genus: Falsodihammus
- Species: F. strandiellus

Binomial name
- Falsodihammus strandiellus Breuning, 1942

Genus of beetles

Falsodihammus strandiellus is a species of beetle in the family Cerambycidae, and the only species in the genus Falsodihammus. It was described by Breuning in 1942.
