= Pseudocoedomea =

Scientific classification
- Kingdom: Animalia
- Phylum: Arthropoda
- Class: Insecta
- Order: Coleoptera
- Suborder: Polyphaga
- Infraorder: Cucujiformia
- Family: Cerambycidae
- Genus: Pseudocoedomea
- Species: P. rondoni

Binomial name
- Pseudocoedomea rondoni (Breuning, 1968)

Genus of beetles

Pseudocoedomea rondoni is a species of beetle in the family Cerambycidae, and the only species in the genus Pseudocoedomea. It was described by Stephan von Breuning in 1968.
