= Metoxylamia =

Scientific classification
- Kingdom: Animalia
- Phylum: Arthropoda
- Class: Insecta
- Order: Coleoptera
- Suborder: Polyphaga
- Infraorder: Cucujiformia
- Family: Cerambycidae
- Genus: Metoxylamia; Dillon & Dillon, 1959
- Species: M. variegator

Binomial name
- Metoxylamia variegator (Aurivillius, 1907)

Synonyms
- Monochamus variegator Aurivillius, 1907; Oxylamia variegatrix Breuning, 1944 (Missp.); Metoxylamia variegatrix Breuning, 1944 (Missp.)

Species of beetle

Metoxylamia variegator is a species of beetle in the family Cerambycidae, and the only species in the genus Metoxylamia. It was described by Per Olof Christopher Aurivillius in 1907. It is known from Ivory Coast and Cameroon.
