= Lesbra =

Scientific classification
- Kingdom: Animalia
- Phylum: Arthropoda
- Class: Insecta
- Order: Coleoptera
- Suborder: Polyphaga
- Infraorder: Cucujiformia
- Family: Cerambycidae
- Genus: Lesbra
- Species: L. graueri

Binomial name
- Lesbra graueri (Hintz, 1916)

Genus of beetles

Lesbra graueri is a species of beetle in the family Cerambycidae, and the only species in the genus Lesbra. It was described by Hintz in 1916.
