= Trichorsidis =

Scientific classification
- Kingdom: Animalia
- Phylum: Arthropoda
- Class: Insecta
- Order: Coleoptera
- Suborder: Polyphaga
- Infraorder: Cucujiformia
- Family: Cerambycidae
- Genus: Trichorsidis
- Species: T. hiekei

Binomial name
- Trichorsidis hiekei Breuning, 1965

Genus of beetles

Trichorsidis hiekei is a species of beetle in the family Cerambycidae, and the only species in the genus Trichorsidis. It was described by Stephan von Breuning in 1965.
