= Mimonephelotes =

Scientific classification
- Kingdom: Animalia
- Phylum: Arthropoda
- Class: Insecta
- Order: Coleoptera
- Suborder: Polyphaga
- Infraorder: Cucujiformia
- Family: Cerambycidae
- Genus: Mimonephelotes
- Species: M. enganensis

Binomial name
- Mimonephelotes enganensis Breuning, 1970

Synonyms
- Mimanhammus enganensis (Breuning, 1970)

Genus of beetles

Mimonephelotes enganensis is a species of beetle in the family Cerambycidae, and the only species in the genus Mimonephelotes. It was described by Breuning in 1970. Breuning mistakenly thought the name was a junior homonym of the genus Mimonephelotus and proposed a replacement name, Mimanhammus in 1971, but under the ICZN the two names are not homonyms, so the original genus name is valid.
