= Thylactomimus =

Scientific classification
- Kingdom: Animalia
- Phylum: Arthropoda
- Class: Insecta
- Order: Coleoptera
- Suborder: Polyphaga
- Infraorder: Cucujiformia
- Family: Cerambycidae
- Genus: Thylactomimus
- Species: T. albolateralis

Binomial name
- Thylactomimus albolateralis Breuning, 1959

Genus of beetles

Thylactomimus albolateralis is a species of beetle in the family Cerambycidae, and the only species in the genus Thylactomimus. It was described by Stephan von Breuning in 1959.
