= Trichomelanauster =

Scientific classification
- Kingdom: Animalia
- Phylum: Arthropoda
- Class: Insecta
- Order: Coleoptera
- Suborder: Polyphaga
- Infraorder: Cucujiformia
- Family: Cerambycidae
- Genus: Trichomelanauster
- Species: T. albomaculatus

Binomial name
- Trichomelanauster albomaculatus Breuning, 1983

Genus of beetles

Trichomelanauster albomaculatus is a species of beetle in the family Cerambycidae, and the only species in the genus Trichomelanauster. It was described by Stephan von Breuning in 1983.
