= Guttulamia =

Scientific classification
- Kingdom: Animalia
- Phylum: Arthropoda
- Class: Insecta
- Order: Coleoptera
- Suborder: Polyphaga
- Infraorder: Cucujiformia
- Family: Cerambycidae
- Genus: Guttulamia; Dillon & Dillon, 1959
- Species: G. aurigutta

Binomial name
- Guttulamia aurigutta (Jordan, 1903)

Synonyms
- Monochamus aurigutta (Jordan, 1903)

Species of beetle

Guttulamia aurigutta is a species of beetle in the family Cerambycidae, and the only species in the genus Guttulamia. It was described by Karl Jordan in 1903.
