= Paradihammus =

Scientific classification
- Kingdom: Animalia
- Phylum: Arthropoda
- Class: Insecta
- Order: Coleoptera
- Suborder: Polyphaga
- Infraorder: Cucujiformia
- Family: Cerambycidae
- Genus: Paradihammus
- Species: P. ceylonicus

Binomial name
- Paradihammus ceylonicus Breuning, 1935

Genus of beetles

Paradihammus ceylonicus is a species of beetle in the family Cerambycidae, and the only species in the genus Paradihammus. It was described by Breuning in 1935.
