= Eryalus =

Scientific classification
- Kingdom: Animalia
- Phylum: Arthropoda
- Class: Insecta
- Order: Coleoptera
- Suborder: Polyphaga
- Infraorder: Cucujiformia
- Family: Cerambycidae
- Genus: Eryalus
- Species: E. tigrinus

Binomial name
- Eryalus tigrinus (J. Thomson, 1878)

Genus of beetles

Eryalus tigrinus is a species of beetle in the family Cerambycidae, and the only species in the genus Eryalus. It was described by J. Thomson in 1878.
