= Stegenus =

Scientific classification
- Kingdom: Animalia
- Phylum: Arthropoda
- Class: Insecta
- Order: Coleoptera
- Suborder: Polyphaga
- Infraorder: Cucujiformia
- Family: Cerambycidae
- Genus: Stegenus
- Species: S. dactylon

Binomial name
- Stegenus dactylon Pascoe, 1857

Genus of beetles

Stegenus dactylon is a species of beetle in the family Cerambycidae, and the only species in the genus Stegenus. It was described by Pascoe in 1857.
