= Tympanopalpus =

Scientific classification
- Kingdom: Animalia
- Phylum: Arthropoda
- Class: Insecta
- Order: Coleoptera
- Suborder: Polyphaga
- Infraorder: Cucujiformia
- Family: Cerambycidae
- Genus: Tympanopalpus
- Species: T. dorsalis

Binomial name
- Tympanopalpus dorsalis Redtenbacher, 1868

Genus of beetles

Tympanopalpus dorsalis is a species of beetle in the family Cerambycidae, and the only species in the genus Tympanopalpus. It was described by Redtenbacher in 1868.
