= Pseudocyriocrates =

Scientific classification
- Kingdom: Animalia
- Phylum: Arthropoda
- Class: Insecta
- Order: Coleoptera
- Suborder: Polyphaga
- Infraorder: Cucujiformia
- Family: Cerambycidae
- Genus: Pseudocyriocrates
- Species: P. strandi

Binomial name
- Pseudocyriocrates strandi Breuning, 1935

Genus of beetles

Pseudocyriocrates strandi is a species of beetle in the family Cerambycidae, and the only species in the genus Pseudocyriocrates. It was described by Stephan von Breuning in 1935.
