= Falsacalolepta =

Scientific classification
- Kingdom: Animalia
- Phylum: Arthropoda
- Class: Insecta
- Order: Coleoptera
- Suborder: Polyphaga
- Infraorder: Cucujiformia
- Family: Cerambycidae
- Genus: Falsacalolepta
- Species: F. granulipennis

Binomial name
- Falsacalolepta granulipennis Breuning, 1970

Genus of beetles

Falsacalolepta granulipennis is a species of beetle in the family Cerambycidae, and the only species in the genus Falsacalolepta. It was described by Breuning in 1970.
