= Mimolochus =

Scientific classification
- Kingdom: Animalia
- Phylum: Arthropoda
- Class: Insecta
- Order: Coleoptera
- Suborder: Polyphaga
- Infraorder: Cucujiformia
- Family: Cerambycidae
- Genus: Mimolochus
- Species: M. hoefneri

Binomial name
- Mimolochus hoefneri (Thomson, 1865)

Genus of beetles

Mimolochus hoefneri is a species of beetle in the family Cerambycidae, and the only species in the genus Mimolochus. The beetle is recorded to be found in Mexico. It was described by Thomson in 1865.
