= Penhammus =

Scientific classification
- Kingdom: Animalia
- Phylum: Arthropoda
- Class: Insecta
- Order: Coleoptera
- Suborder: Polyphaga
- Infraorder: Cucujiformia
- Family: Cerambycidae
- Genus: Penhammus; Kolbe, 1894
- Species: P. pauper

Binomial name
- Penhammus pauper Kolbe, 1894

Synonyms
- Monochamus pauper (Kolbe, 1894)

Species of beetle

Penhammus pauper is a species of beetle in the family Cerambycidae, and the sole member of the genus Penhammus. It was described by Kolbe in 1894.
