= Batomena =

Scientific classification
- Kingdom: Animalia
- Phylum: Arthropoda
- Class: Insecta
- Order: Coleoptera
- Suborder: Polyphaga
- Infraorder: Cucujiformia
- Family: Cerambycidae
- Genus: Batomena
- Species: B. multispinis

Binomial name
- Batomena multispinis Bates, 1884

Genus of beetles

Batomena multispinis is a species of beetle in the family Cerambycidae, and the only species in the genus Batomena. It was described by Bates in 1884.
