= Agnoderus =

Scientific classification
- Kingdom: Animalia
- Phylum: Arthropoda
- Class: Insecta
- Order: Coleoptera
- Suborder: Polyphaga
- Infraorder: Cucujiformia
- Family: Cerambycidae
- Genus: Agnoderus
- Species: A. gnomoides

Binomial name
- Agnoderus gnomoides Thomson, 1864

Genus of beetles

Agnoderus gnomoides is a species of beetle in the family Cerambycidae, and the only species in the genus Agnoderus. It was described by Thomson in 1864.
