= Superagnia =

Scientific classification
- Kingdom: Animalia
- Phylum: Arthropoda
- Class: Insecta
- Order: Coleoptera
- Suborder: Polyphaga
- Infraorder: Cucujiformia
- Family: Cerambycidae
- Genus: Superagnia
- Species: S. fuchsi

Binomial name
- Superagnia fuchsi Breuning, 1968

Genus of beetles

Superagnia fuchsi is a species of beetle in the family Cerambycidae, and the only species in the genus Superagnia. It was described by Stephan von Breuning in 1968.
