= Bixadus =

Scientific classification
- Kingdom: Animalia
- Phylum: Arthropoda
- Class: Insecta
- Order: Coleoptera
- Suborder: Polyphaga
- Infraorder: Cucujiformia
- Family: Cerambycidae
- Genus: Bixadus
- Species: B. sierricola

Binomial name
- Bixadus sierricola (White, 1858)

Genus of beetles

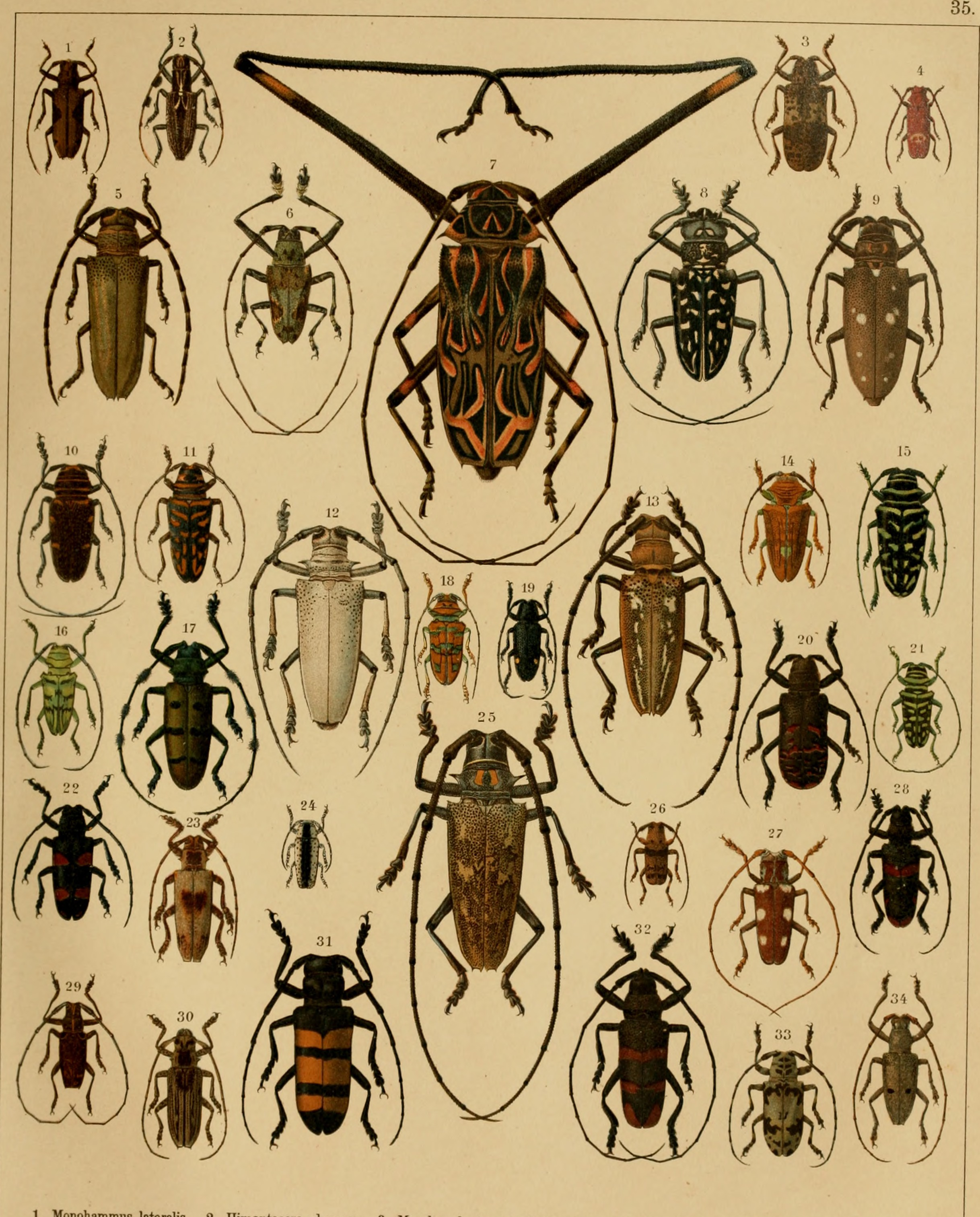
Cerambycidae beetles

Bixadus sierricola is a species of beetle in the family Cerambycidae, and the only species in the genus Bixadus. It was described by White in 1858.
