= Mimomyagrus =

Scientific classification
- Kingdom: Animalia
- Phylum: Arthropoda
- Class: Insecta
- Order: Coleoptera
- Suborder: Polyphaga
- Infraorder: Cucujiformia
- Family: Cerambycidae
- Genus: Mimomyagrus
- Species: M. pfanneri

Binomial name
- Mimomyagrus pfanneri Breuning, 1970

Genus of beetles

Mimomyagrus pfanneri is a species of beetle in the family Cerambycidae, and the only species in the genus Mimomyagrus. It was described by Breuning in 1970.
