= Didyochamus =

Scientific classification
- Kingdom: Animalia
- Phylum: Arthropoda
- Class: Insecta
- Order: Coleoptera
- Suborder: Polyphaga
- Infraorder: Cucujiformia
- Family: Cerambycidae
- Genus: Didyochamus; Dillon & Dillon, 1959
- Species: D. flavomarmoratus

Binomial name
- Didyochamus flavomarmoratus (Breuning, 1935)

Synonyms
- Monochamus flavomarmoratus Breuning, 1935

Species of beetle

Didyochamus flavomarmoratus is a species of beetle in the family Cerambycidae, and the sole member of the genus Didyochamus. It was described by Stephan von Breuning in 1935.
