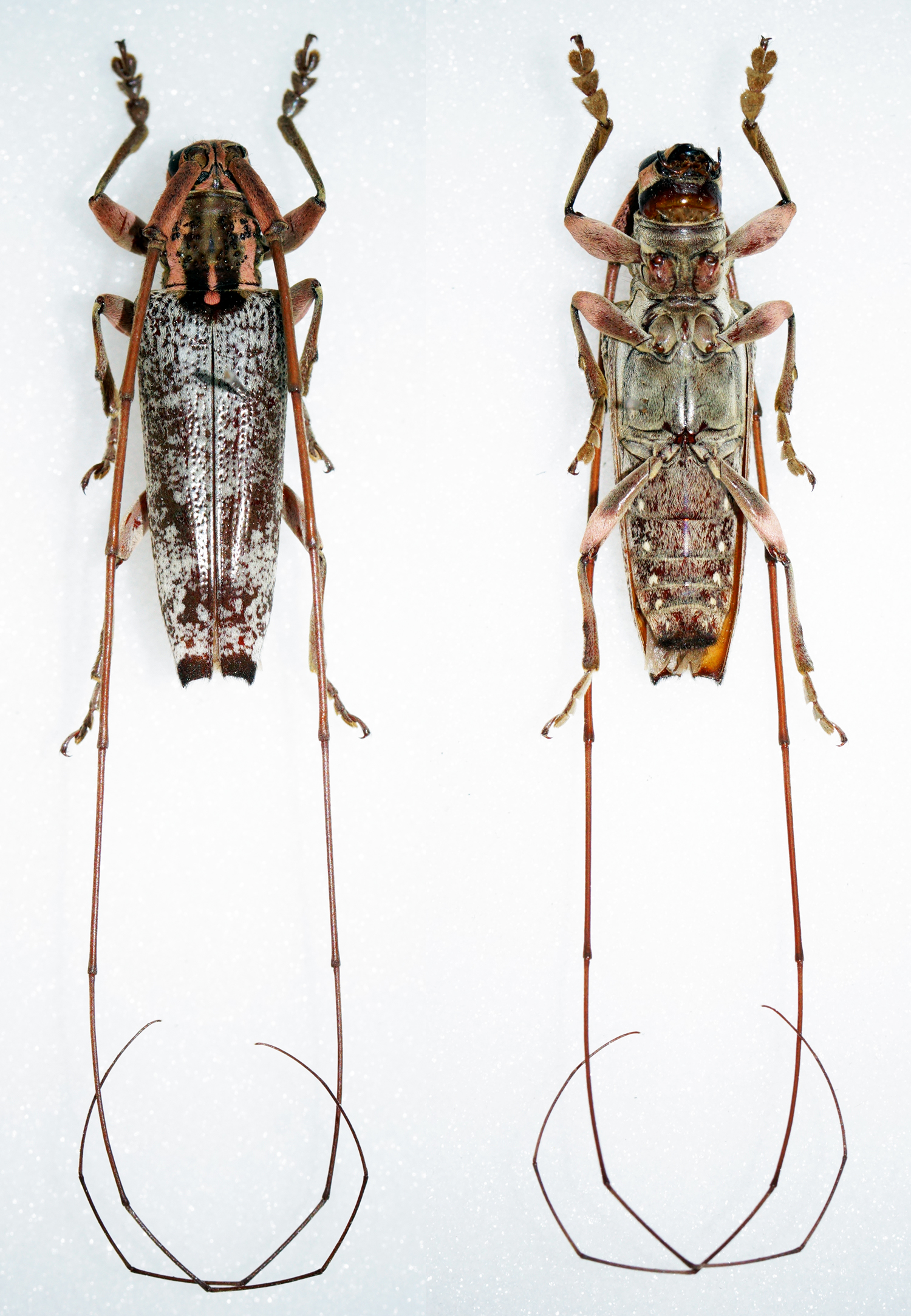

Scientific classification
- Kingdom: Animalia
- Phylum: Arthropoda
- Class: Insecta
- Order: Coleoptera
- Suborder: Polyphaga
- Infraorder: Cucujiformia
- Family: Cerambycidae
- Genus: Amechana
- Species: A. nobilis

Binomial name
- Amechana nobilis J. Thomson, 1864

= Amechana =

Genus of beetles

Amechana nobilis is a species of beetle in the family Cerambycidae, and the only species in the genus Amechana. It was described by J. Thomson in 1864.
