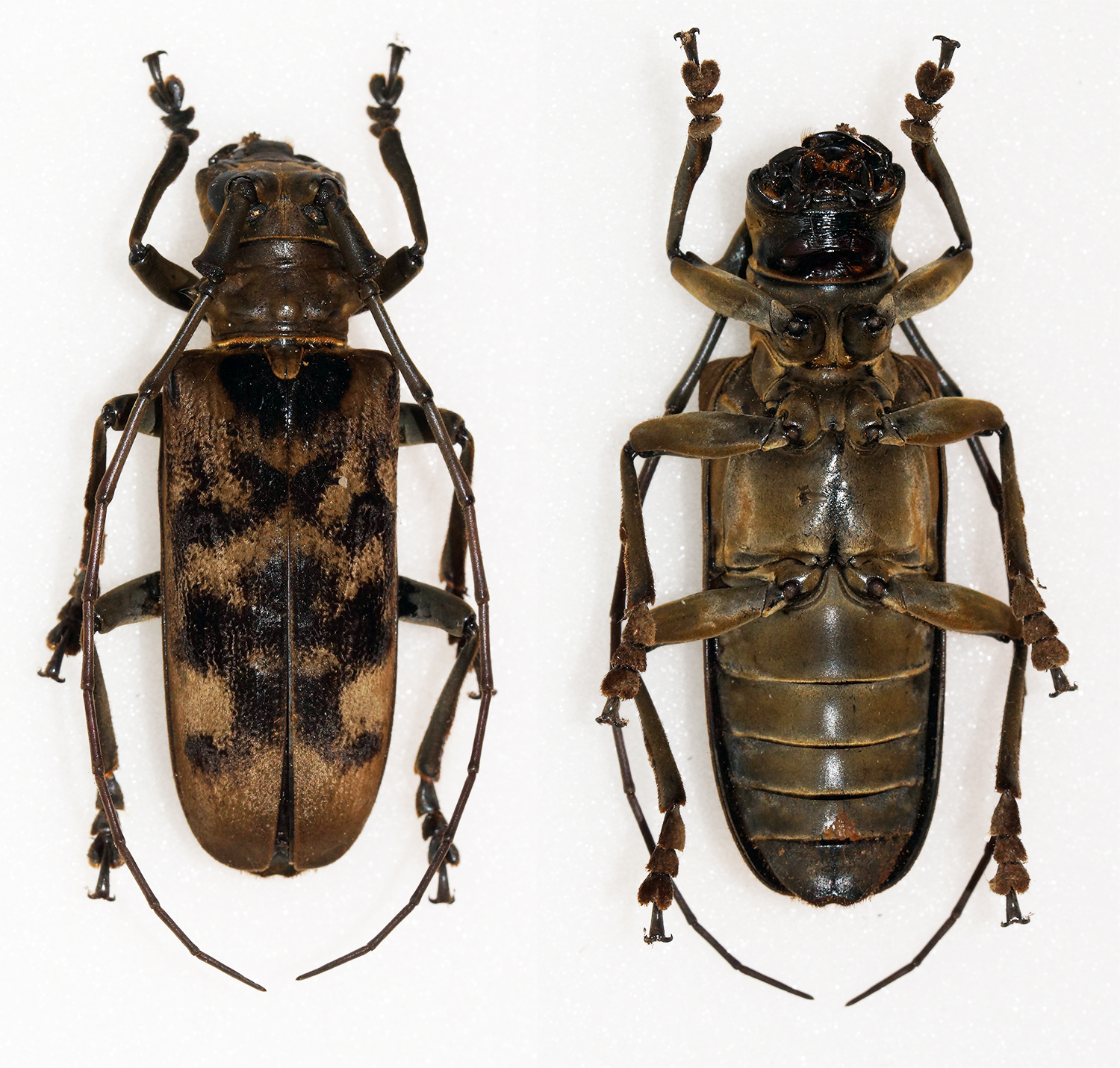

Scientific classification
- Kingdom: Animalia
- Phylum: Arthropoda
- Class: Insecta
- Order: Coleoptera
- Suborder: Polyphaga
- Infraorder: Cucujiformia
- Family: Cerambycidae
- Genus: Macrohammus
- Species: M. deyrollei

Binomial name
- Macrohammus deyrollei (Thomson, 1879)

= Macrohammus =

Genus of beetles

Macrohammus deyrollei is a species of beetle in the family Cerambycidae, and the only species in the genus Macrohammus. It was described by Thomson in 1879.
