= Gibbohammus =

Scientific classification
- Kingdom: Animalia
- Phylum: Arthropoda
- Class: Insecta
- Order: Coleoptera
- Suborder: Polyphaga
- Infraorder: Cucujiformia
- Family: Cerambycidae
- Genus: Gibbohammus
- Species: G. stricticollis

Binomial name
- Gibbohammus stricticollis Wang & Chiang, 1999

Genus of beetles

Gibbohammus stricticollis is a species of beetle in the family Cerambycidae, and the only species in the genus Gibbohammus. It was described by Wang and Chiang in 1999.
