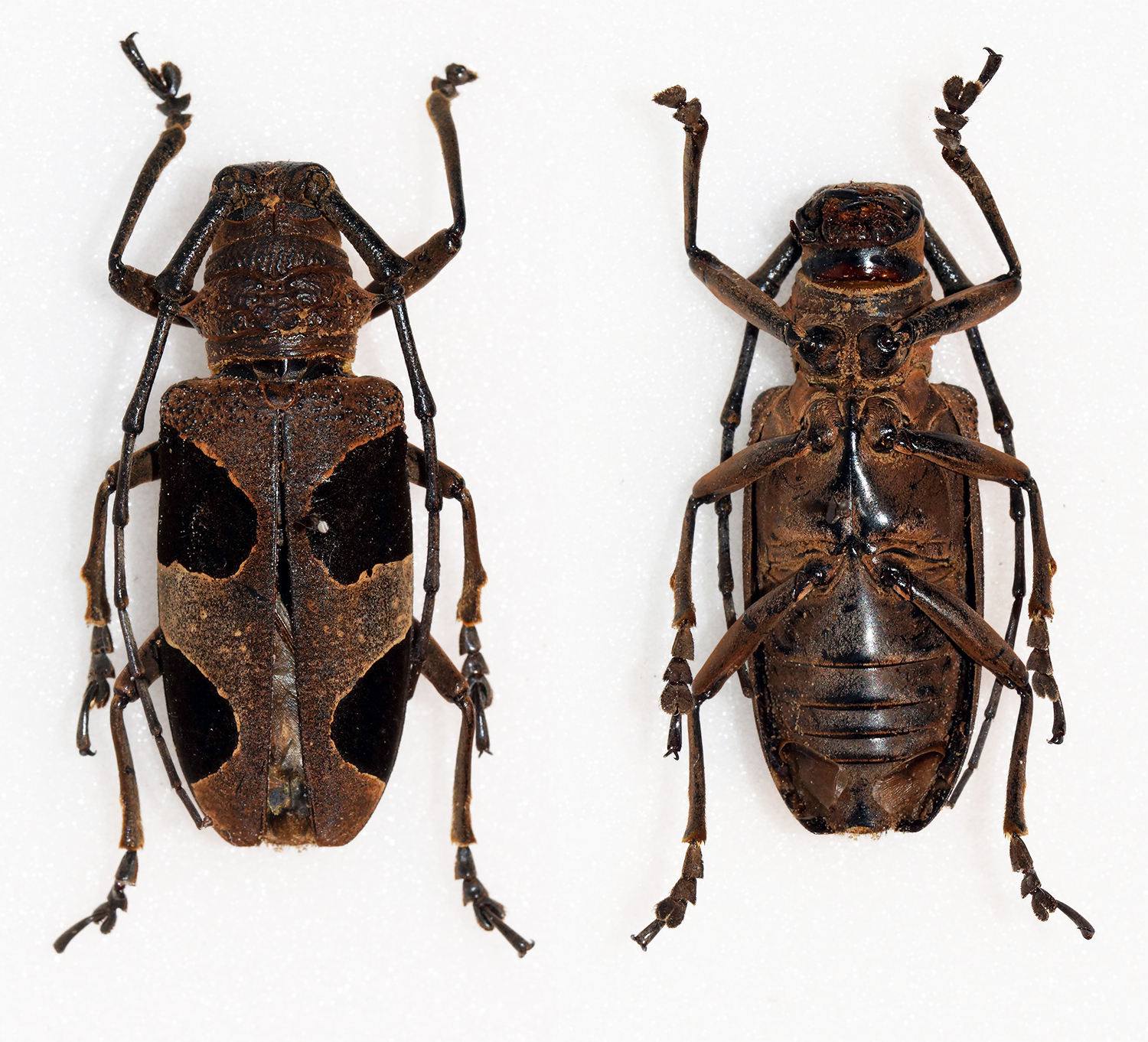

Scientific classification
- Kingdom: Animalia
- Phylum: Arthropoda
- Class: Insecta
- Order: Coleoptera
- Suborder: Polyphaga
- Infraorder: Cucujiformia
- Family: Cerambycidae
- Genus: Parepicedia
- Species: P. fimbriata

Binomial name
- Parepicedia fimbriata (Chevrolat, 1856)

= Parepicedia =

Genus of beetles

Parepicedia fimbriata is a species of beetle in the family Cerambycidae, and the only species in the genus Parepicedia. It was described by Chevrolat in 1856.
