= Neodihammus =

Scientific classification
- Kingdom: Animalia
- Phylum: Arthropoda
- Class: Insecta
- Order: Coleoptera
- Suborder: Polyphaga
- Infraorder: Cucujiformia
- Family: Cerambycidae
- Genus: Neodihammus
- Species: N. pici

Binomial name
- Neodihammus pici Breuning, 1935

Genus of beetles

Neodihammus pici is a species of beetle in the family Cerambycidae, and the only species in the genus Neodihammus. It was described by Breuning in 1935.
