= Bixadoides =

Scientific classification
- Kingdom: Animalia
- Phylum: Arthropoda
- Class: Insecta
- Order: Coleoptera
- Suborder: Polyphaga
- Infraorder: Cucujiformia
- Family: Cerambycidae
- Genus: Bixadoides
- Species: B. allardi

Binomial name
- Bixadoides allardi Breuning, 1966

Genus of beetles

Bixadoides allardi is a species of beetle in the family Cerambycidae, and the only species in the genus Bixadoides. It was described by Breuning in 1966.
