= Mimepuraecha =

Scientific classification
- Kingdom: Animalia
- Phylum: Arthropoda
- Class: Insecta
- Order: Coleoptera
- Suborder: Polyphaga
- Infraorder: Cucujiformia
- Family: Cerambycidae
- Genus: Mimepuraecha
- Species: M. celebensis

Binomial name
- Mimepuraecha celebensis Breuning, 1974

Genus of beetles

Mimepuraecha celebensis is a species of beetle in the family Cerambycidae, and the only species in the genus Mimepuraecha. It was described by Breuning in 1974.
