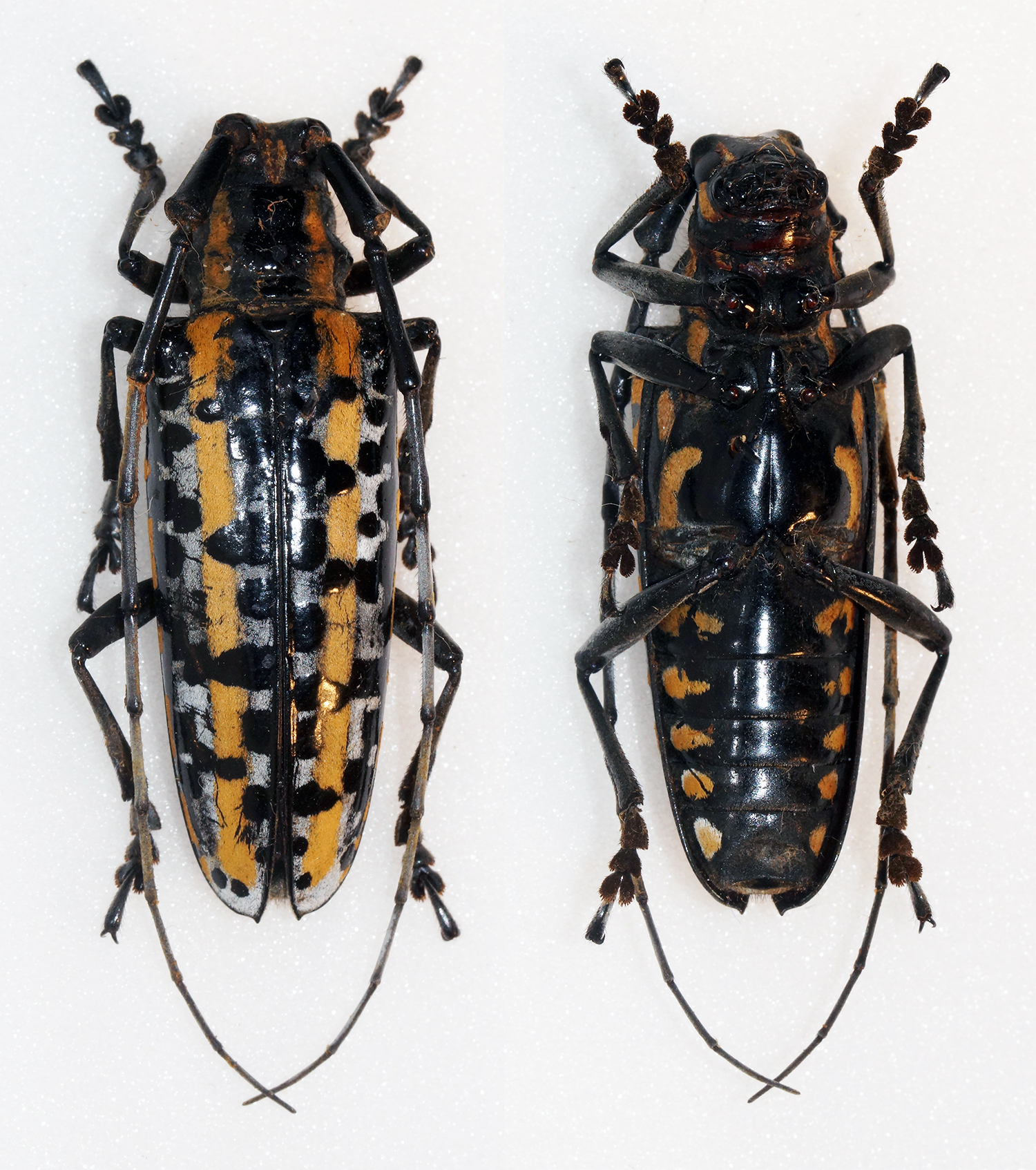

Scientific classification
- Domain: Eukaryota
- Kingdom: Animalia
- Phylum: Arthropoda
- Class: Insecta
- Order: Coleoptera
- Suborder: Polyphaga
- Infraorder: Cucujiformia
- Family: Cerambycidae
- Subfamily: Lamiinae
- Tribe: Monochamini
- Genus: Deliathis
- Species: D. buquetii

Binomial name
- Deliathis buquetii (Tasté, 1841)

Synonyms
- Taeniotes buqueti Taslé, 1841; Deliathis buqueti (Tasté, 1841); Taeniotes buqueti (Tasté, 1841)

= Deliathis buquetii =

Species of beetle

Deliathis buquetii is a species of beetle in the family Cerambycidae. It was described by Tasté in 1841, originally under the genus Taeniotes. It is known from Honduras, Belize, and Mexico. It contains the varietas Deliathis buquetii var. mira.
