= Deliathis neonivea =

Scientific classification
- Domain: Eukaryota
- Kingdom: Animalia
- Phylum: Arthropoda
- Class: Insecta
- Order: Coleoptera
- Suborder: Polyphaga
- Infraorder: Cucujiformia
- Family: Cerambycidae
- Subfamily: Lamiinae
- Tribe: Monochamini
- Genus: Deliathis
- Species: D. neonivea

Binomial name
- Deliathis neonivea Santos-Silva & Botero, 2018

Synonyms
- Hammoderus niveus Breuning, 1943; Plagiohammus niveus (Breuning, 1943)

Species of longhorn beetle

Deliathis neonivea is a species of beetle in the family Cerambycidae. It was described by Stephan von Breuning in 1943, but the original name is a junior homonym of Deliathis nivea so its name was replaced in 2018. It is known from Mexico.
