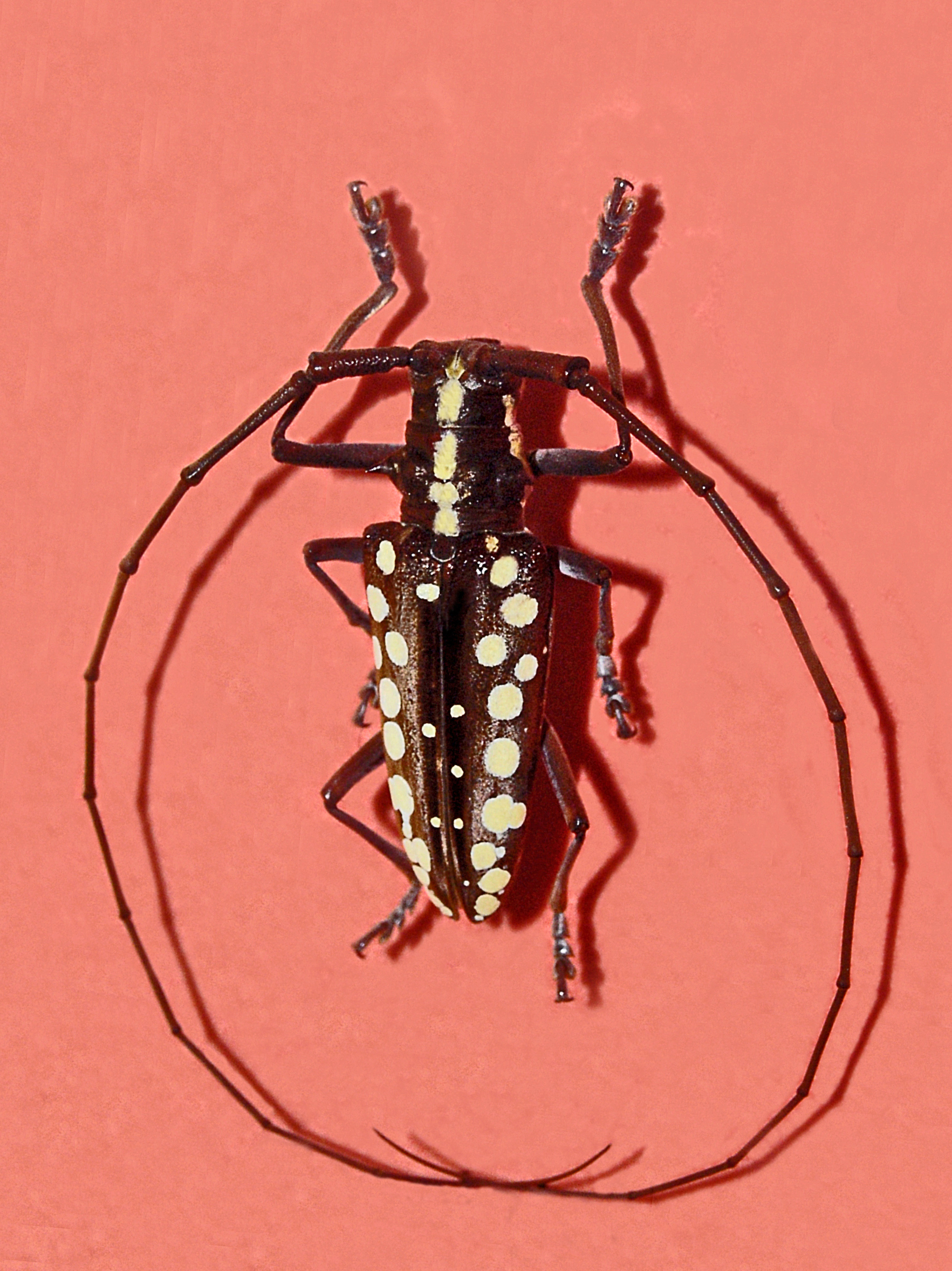
- Museum specimen of Taeniotes farinosus

Scientific classification
- Domain: Eukaryota
- Kingdom: Animalia
- Phylum: Arthropoda
- Class: Insecta
- Order: Coleoptera
- Suborder: Polyphaga
- Infraorder: Cucujiformia
- Family: Cerambycidae
- Tribe: Lamiini
- Genus: Taeniotes; Audinet-Serville, 1835

Synonyms
- Hammoderus Thomson, 1856

= Taeniotes =

Genus of beetles

Taeniotes is a genus of flat-faced longhorns beetles in the subfamily Lamiinae of the family Cerambycidae.

== Species ==
Species within this genus include:

- Taeniotes affinis Breuning, 1935
- Taeniotes amazonum Thomson, 1857
- Taeniotes batesi (Thomson, 1879)
- Taeniotes boliviensis Dillon & Dillon, 1941
- Taeniotes buckleyi Bates, 1872
- Taeniotes cayennensis Thomson, 1859
- Taeniotes chapini Dillon & Dillon, 1941
- Taeniotes dentatus Dillon & Dillon, 1941
- Taeniotes farinosus (Linnaeus, 1758)
- Taeniotes inquinatus Thomson, 1857
- Taeniotes insularis Thomson, 1857
- Taeniotes iridescens Dillon & Dillon, 1941
- Taeniotes leucogrammus Thomson, 1865
- Taeniotes luciani Thomson, 1859
- Taeniotes marmoratus Thomson, 1865
- Taeniotes naevius Bates, 1872
- Taeniotes orbignyi Guérin-Méneville, 1844
- Taeniotes parafarinosus Breuning, 1971
- Taeniotes peruanus Breuning, 1971
- Taeniotes praeclarus Bates, 1872
- Taeniotes scalatus (Gmelin, 1790)
- Taeniotes similis Dillon & Dillon, 1941
- Taeniotes simplex Gahan, 1888
- Taeniotes subocellatus (Olivier, 1792)
- Taeniotes xanthostictus Bates, 1880
