= Taeniotes leucogrammus =

Scientific classification
- Domain: Eukaryota
- Kingdom: Animalia
- Phylum: Arthropoda
- Class: Insecta
- Order: Coleoptera
- Suborder: Polyphaga
- Infraorder: Cucujiformia
- Family: Cerambycidae
- Tribe: Lamiini
- Genus: Taeniotes
- Species: T. leucogrammus

Binomial name
- Taeniotes leucogrammus Thomson, 1865

Species of beetle

Taeniotes leucogrammus is a species of beetle in the family Cerambycidae. It was described by James Thomson in 1865.

== Subspecies ==
- Taeniotes leucogrammus luciae Touroult, 2007
- Taeniotes leucogrammus leucogrammus Thomson, 1865
