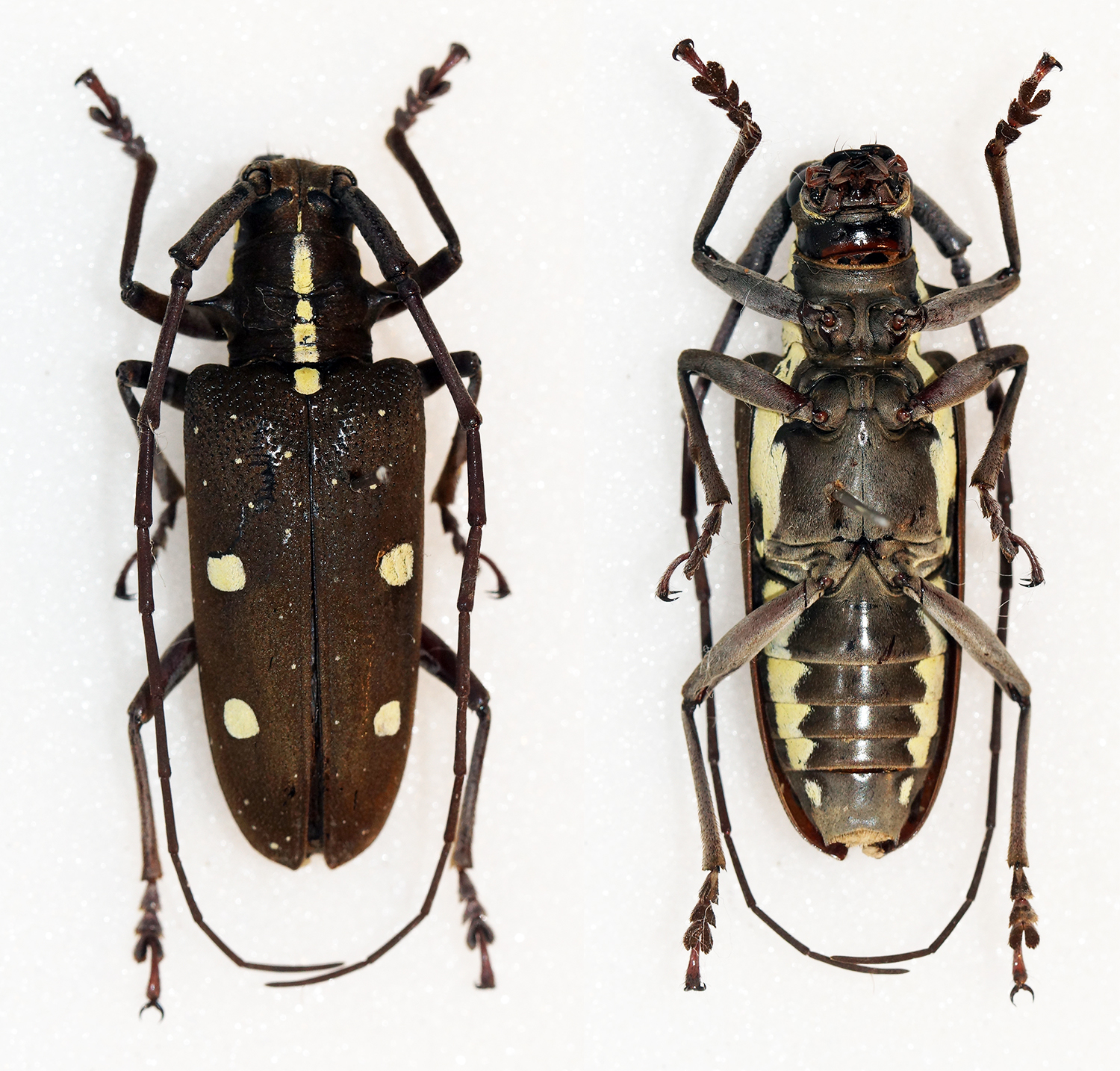
- Dorsal and ventral views

Scientific classification
- Domain: Eukaryota
- Kingdom: Animalia
- Phylum: Arthropoda
- Class: Insecta
- Order: Coleoptera
- Suborder: Polyphaga
- Infraorder: Cucujiformia
- Family: Cerambycidae
- Tribe: Lamiini
- Genus: Taeniotes
- Species: T. luciani

Binomial name
- Taeniotes luciani Thomson, 1859

Synonyms
- Taeniotes buqueti (Thomson, 1856); Taeniotes buquetii (Thomson, 1856) nec Taslé, 1841; Hammoderus buquetii Thomson, 1856

= Taeniotes luciani =

Species of beetle

Taeniotes luciani is a species of beetle in the family Cerambycidae. It was described by James Thomson in 1859. It is known from Colombia, Mexico, Honduras, Belize, Guatemala, Costa Rica and Panama.
