= Taeniotes affinis =

Scientific classification
- Kingdom: Animalia
- Phylum: Arthropoda
- Class: Insecta
- Order: Coleoptera
- Suborder: Polyphaga
- Infraorder: Cucujiformia
- Family: Cerambycidae
- Genus: Taeniotes
- Species: T. affinis

Binomial name
- Taeniotes affinis Breuning, 1935

Species of beetle

Taeniotes affinis is a species of beetle in the family Cerambycidae. It was described by Stephan von Breuning in 1935. It is known from Peru and Ecuador.
