= Neoptychodes candidus =

Scientific classification
- Domain: Eukaryota
- Kingdom: Animalia
- Phylum: Arthropoda
- Class: Insecta
- Order: Coleoptera
- Suborder: Polyphaga
- Infraorder: Cucujiformia
- Family: Cerambycidae
- Tribe: Lamiini
- Genus: Neoptychodes
- Species: N. candidus

Binomial name
- Neoptychodes candidus (Bates, 1885)

Species of beetle

Neoptychodes candidus is a species of beetle in the family Cerambycidae. It was described by Henry Walter Bates in 1885. It is known from Colombia and Costa Rica.
