= Deliathis batesi =

Scientific classification
- Domain: Eukaryota
- Kingdom: Animalia
- Phylum: Arthropoda
- Class: Insecta
- Order: Coleoptera
- Suborder: Polyphaga
- Infraorder: Cucujiformia
- Family: Cerambycidae
- Subfamily: Lamiinae
- Tribe: Monochamini
- Genus: Deliathis
- Species: D. batesi

Binomial name
- Deliathis batesi Gahan, 1888

Species of beetle

Deliathis batesi is a species of beetle in the family Cerambycidae. It was described by Charles Joseph Gahan in 1888. It is known from Mexico.
