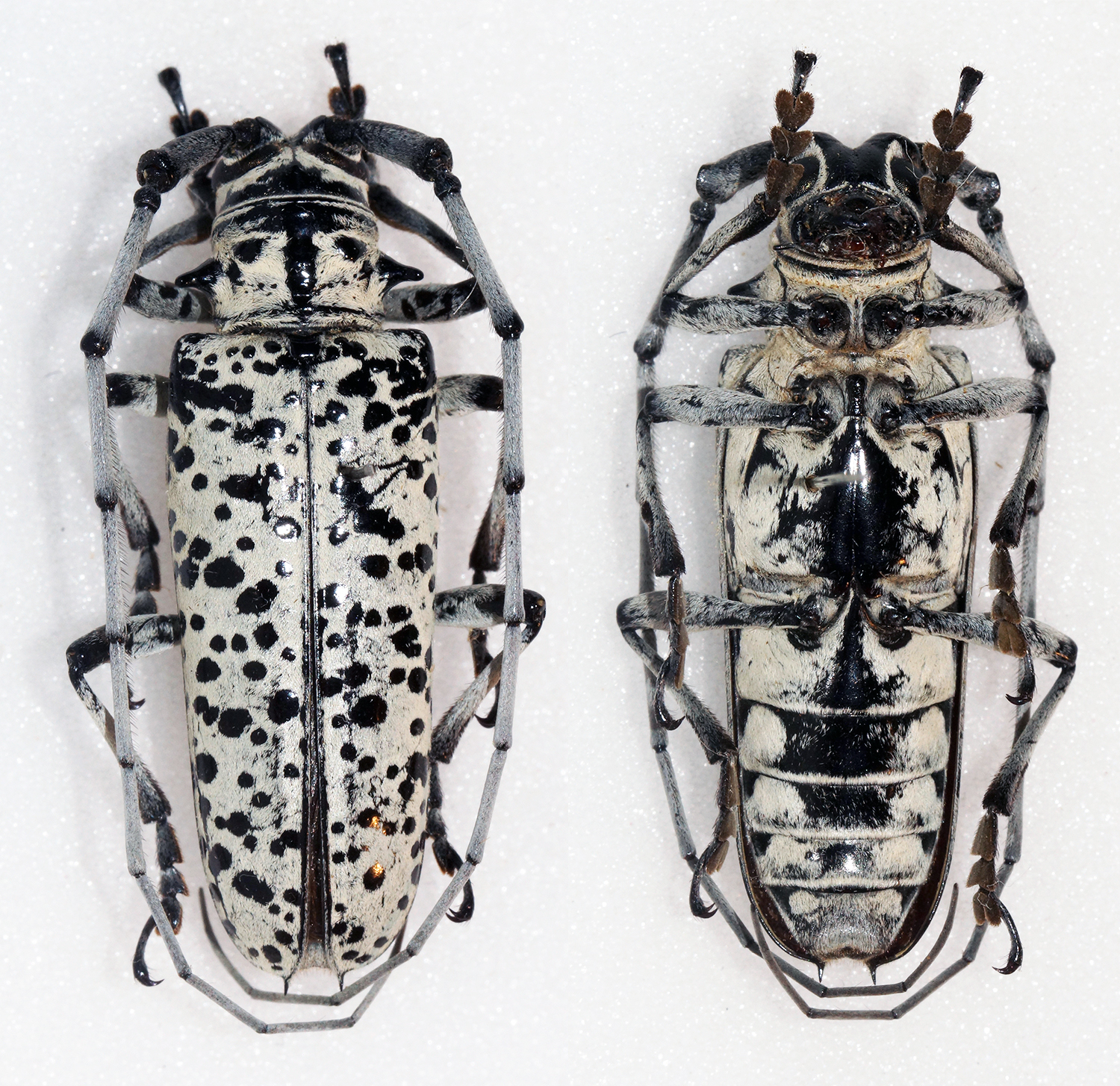

Scientific classification
- Domain: Eukaryota
- Kingdom: Animalia
- Phylum: Arthropoda
- Class: Insecta
- Order: Coleoptera
- Suborder: Polyphaga
- Infraorder: Cucujiformia
- Family: Cerambycidae
- Subfamily: Lamiinae
- Tribe: Monochamini
- Genus: Deliathis
- Species: D. impluviata

Binomial name
- Deliathis impluviata (Lacordaire, 1869)

Synonyms
- Deliathis impluviatus (misspelling); Deliathis poecilodryas Bates, 1880; Hammatoderus impluviatus Lacordaire, 1869; Plagiohammus impluviatus (Lacordaire, 1869)

= Deliathis impluviata =

Species of beetle

Deliathis impluviata is a species of beetle in the family Cerambycidae. It was described by Lacordaire in 1869. It is known from Mexico and Guatemala.
