= Deliathis parincana =

Scientific classification
- Kingdom: Animalia
- Phylum: Arthropoda
- Class: Insecta
- Order: Coleoptera
- Suborder: Polyphaga
- Infraorder: Cucujiformia
- Family: Cerambycidae
- Subfamily: Lamiinae
- Tribe: Monochamini
- Genus: Deliathis
- Species: D. parincana

Binomial name
- Deliathis parincana Breuning, 1971

Species of beetle

Deliathis parincana is a species of beetle in the family Cerambycidae. It was described by Stephan von Breuning in 1971. It is known from Mexico.
