= Taeniotes simplex =

Scientific classification
- Domain: Eukaryota
- Kingdom: Animalia
- Phylum: Arthropoda
- Class: Insecta
- Order: Coleoptera
- Suborder: Polyphaga
- Infraorder: Cucujiformia
- Family: Cerambycidae
- Tribe: Lamiini
- Genus: Taeniotes
- Species: T. simplex

Binomial name
- Taeniotes simplex Gahan, 1888

Synonyms
- Taeniotes hayi (Mutchler, 1938); Monochamus cocoensis Mutchler, 1938; Monochammus hayi Mutchler, 1938

Species of beetle

Taeniotes simplex is a species of beetle in the family Cerambycidae. It was described by Charles Joseph Gahan in 1888. It is known from the Galápagos Islands and Costa Rica.
