= Neoptychodes cretatus =

Scientific classification
- Domain: Eukaryota
- Kingdom: Animalia
- Phylum: Arthropoda
- Class: Insecta
- Order: Coleoptera
- Suborder: Polyphaga
- Infraorder: Cucujiformia
- Family: Cerambycidae
- Tribe: Lamiini
- Genus: Neoptychodes
- Species: N. cretatus

Binomial name
- Neoptychodes cretatus (Bates, 1872)

Synonyms
- Ptychodes cretatus Bates, 1872; Neoptychodes cretata (Bates, 1872) (misspelling)

Species of beetle

Neoptychodes cretatus is a species of beetle in the family Cerambycidae. It was described by Henry Walter Bates in 1872. It is known from Nicaragua, Costa Rica and Panama.
