= Taeniotes batesi =

Scientific classification
- Domain: Eukaryota
- Kingdom: Animalia
- Phylum: Arthropoda
- Class: Insecta
- Order: Coleoptera
- Suborder: Polyphaga
- Infraorder: Cucujiformia
- Family: Cerambycidae
- Tribe: Lamiini
- Genus: Taeniotes
- Species: T. batesi

Binomial name
- Taeniotes batesi (Thomson, 1879)

Synonyms
- Taeniotes strandi Breuning, 1935; Hammoderus batesi Thomson, 1879

Species of beetle

Taeniotes batesi is a species of beetle in the family Cerambycidae. It was described by James Thomson in 1879. It is known from Colombia.
