= Taeniotes subocellatus =

Scientific classification
- Kingdom: Animalia
- Phylum: Arthropoda
- Clade: Pancrustacea
- Class: Insecta
- Order: Coleoptera
- Suborder: Polyphaga
- Infraorder: Cucujiformia
- Family: Cerambycidae
- Genus: Taeniotes
- Species: T. subocellatus

Binomial name
- Taeniotes subocellatus (Olivier, 1792)

Synonyms
- Cerambyx ocellatus Fabricius, 1801; Cerambyx subocellatus Olivier, 1792; Monochamus decoratus Laporte de Castelnau, 1840; Taeniotes decoratus (Laporte de Castelnau), Thomson, 1859

Species of beetle

Taeniotes subocellatus is a species of flat-faced longhorn beetles in the subfamily Lamiinae of the family Cerambycidae.

== Description ==
Taeniotes subocellatus can reach a length of 30–35 millimetres (1.2–1.4 in). Basic color of body is dark brown, with large yellow dorsal spots.

== Distribution ==
This species is present in Guyana, Suriname and Venezuela.
