= Deliathis quadritaeniator =

Scientific classification
- Kingdom: Animalia
- Phylum: Arthropoda
- Class: Insecta
- Order: Coleoptera
- Suborder: Polyphaga
- Infraorder: Cucujiformia
- Family: Cerambycidae
- Subfamily: Lamiinae
- Tribe: Monochamini
- Genus: Deliathis
- Species: D. quadritaeniator

Binomial name
- Deliathis quadritaeniator (White, 1846)

Synonyms
- Lamia quadritaeniator White, 1846; Plectrodera quadritaeniator Gemminger & Harold, 1873; Taeniotes pazii Rojas, 1856; Deliathis quadritaeniata Santos-Silva & Botero, 2018 (misspelling)

Species of beetle

Deliathis quadritaeniator is a species of beetle in the family Cerambycidae. It was described by Adam White in 1846. It is known from Panama, Costa Rica, Ecuador, Colombia, and Venezuela.
