= Taeniotes buckleyi =

Scientific classification
- Domain: Eukaryota
- Kingdom: Animalia
- Phylum: Arthropoda
- Class: Insecta
- Order: Coleoptera
- Suborder: Polyphaga
- Infraorder: Cucujiformia
- Family: Cerambycidae
- Tribe: Lamiini
- Genus: Taeniotes
- Species: T. buckleyi

Binomial name
- Taeniotes buckleyi Bates, 1872

Species of beetle

Taeniotes buckleyi is a species of beetle in the family Cerambycidae. It was described by Henry Walter Bates in 1872. It is known from Peru and Ecuador.
