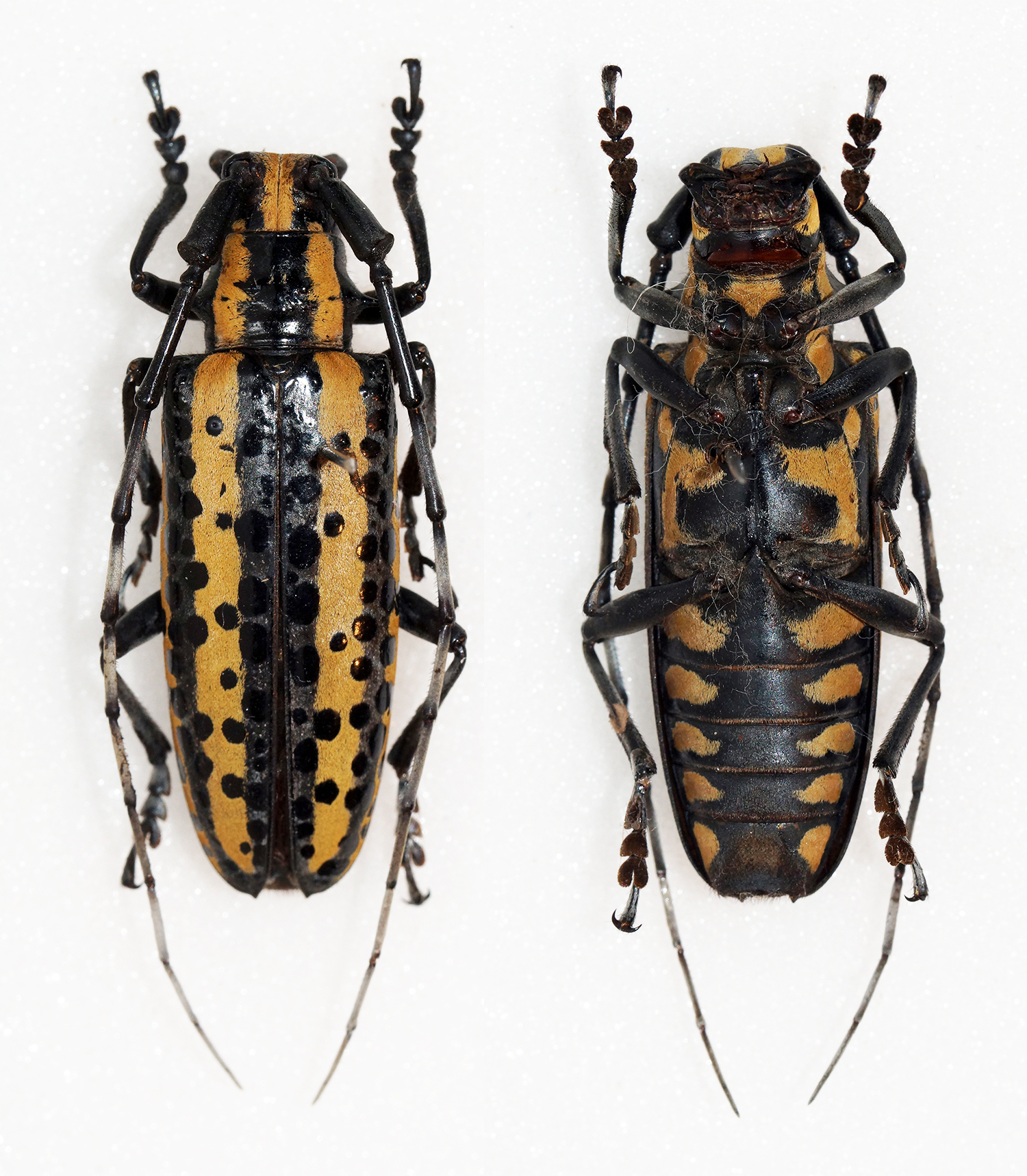

Scientific classification
- Domain: Eukaryota
- Kingdom: Animalia
- Phylum: Arthropoda
- Class: Insecta
- Order: Coleoptera
- Suborder: Polyphaga
- Infraorder: Cucujiformia
- Family: Cerambycidae
- Subfamily: Lamiinae
- Tribe: Monochamini
- Genus: Deliathis
- Species: D. diluta

Binomial name
- Deliathis diluta Gahan, 1892

= Deliathis diluta =

Species of beetle

Deliathis diluta is a species of beetle in the family Cerambycidae. It was described by Charles Joseph Gahan in 1892. It is known from Mexico, Guatemala, El Salvador, and Nicaragua.
