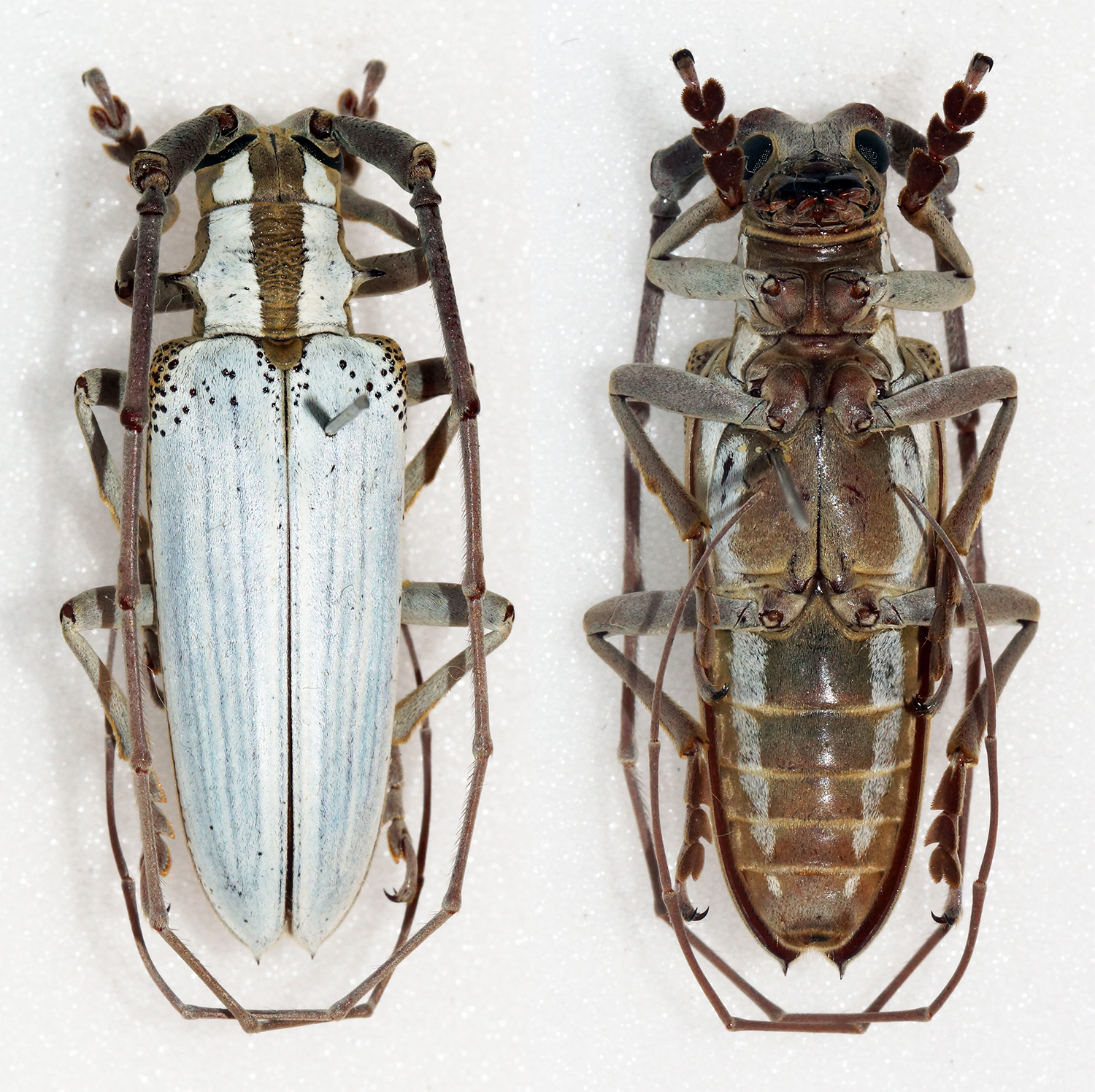
- Deliathis imperator

Scientific classification
- Domain: Eukaryota
- Kingdom: Animalia
- Phylum: Arthropoda
- Class: Insecta
- Order: Coleoptera
- Suborder: Polyphaga
- Infraorder: Cucujiformia
- Family: Cerambycidae
- Subfamily: Lamiinae
- Tribe: Monochamini
- Genus: Deliathis; Thomson, 1860

= Deliathis =

Genus of beetles

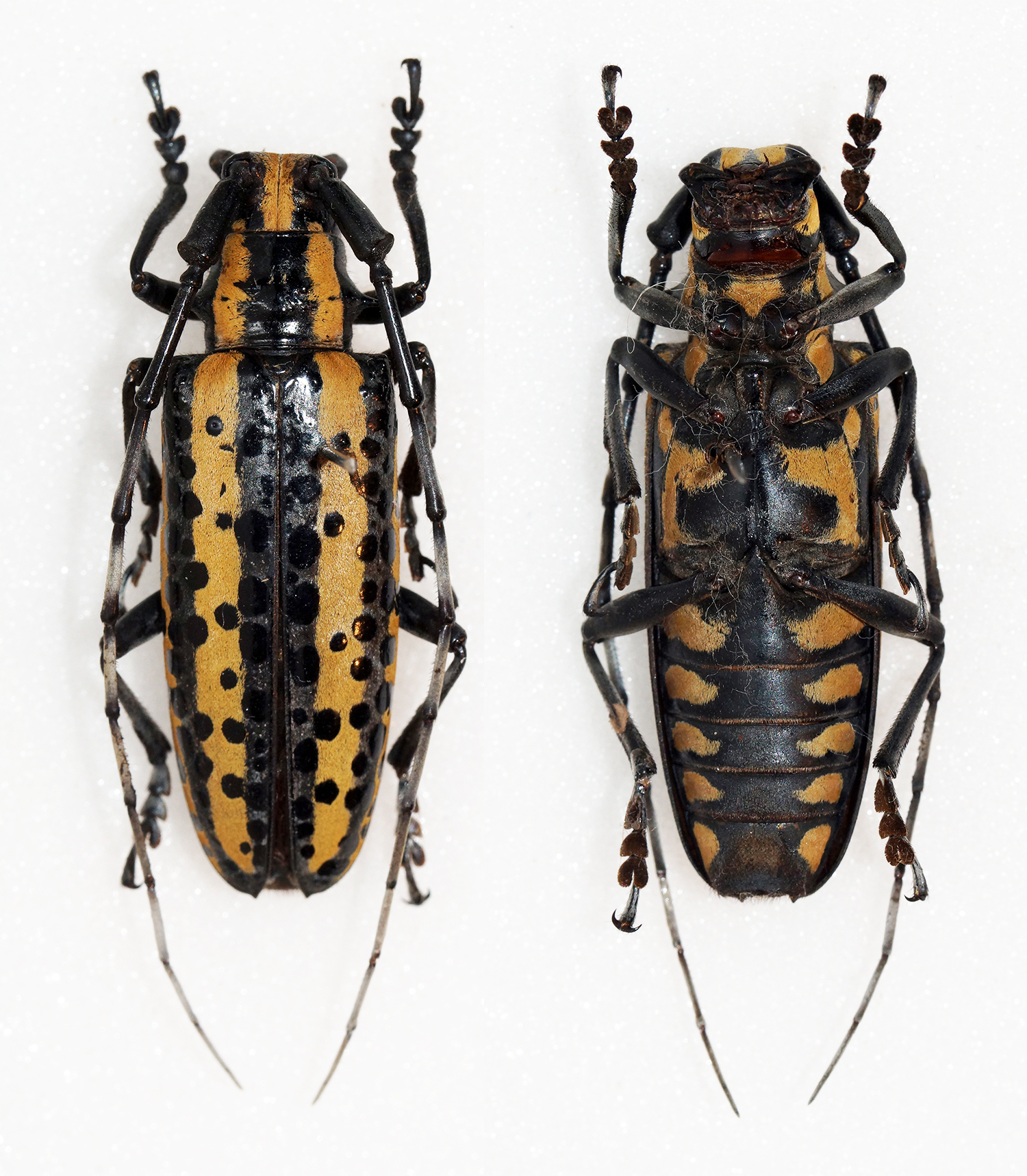
Deliathis diluta

Deliathis is a genus of flat-faced longhorns in the beetle family Cerambycidae. There are about 15 described species in Deliathis, found in the Neotropics.

== Species ==
- Deliathis batesi Gahan, 1888
- Deliathis bifurcata Dillon & Dillon, 1941
- Deliathis buqueti (Taslé, 1841)
- Deliathis diluta Gahan, 1892
- Deliathis flavis Dillon & Dillon, 1941
- Deliathis imperator (Thomson, 1868)
- Deliathis impluviata (Lacordaire, 1869)
- Deliathis incana (Forster, 1771)
- Deliathis neonivea Santos-Silva & Botero, 2018
- Deliathis nigrovittata Breuning, 1980
- Deliathis nivea Bates, 1869
- Deliathis parincana Breuning, 1971
- Deliathis pulchra Thomson, 1865
- Deliathis quadritaeniator (White, 1846)
- Deliathis superba Franz, 1954
