= Taeniotes peruanus =

Scientific classification
- Kingdom: Animalia
- Phylum: Arthropoda
- Class: Insecta
- Order: Coleoptera
- Suborder: Polyphaga
- Infraorder: Cucujiformia
- Family: Cerambycidae
- Genus: Taeniotes
- Species: T. peruanus

Binomial name
- Taeniotes peruanus Breuning, 1971

Species of beetle

Taeniotes peruanus is a species of beetle in the family Cerambycidae. It was described by Stephan von Breuning in 1971. It is known from Peru.
