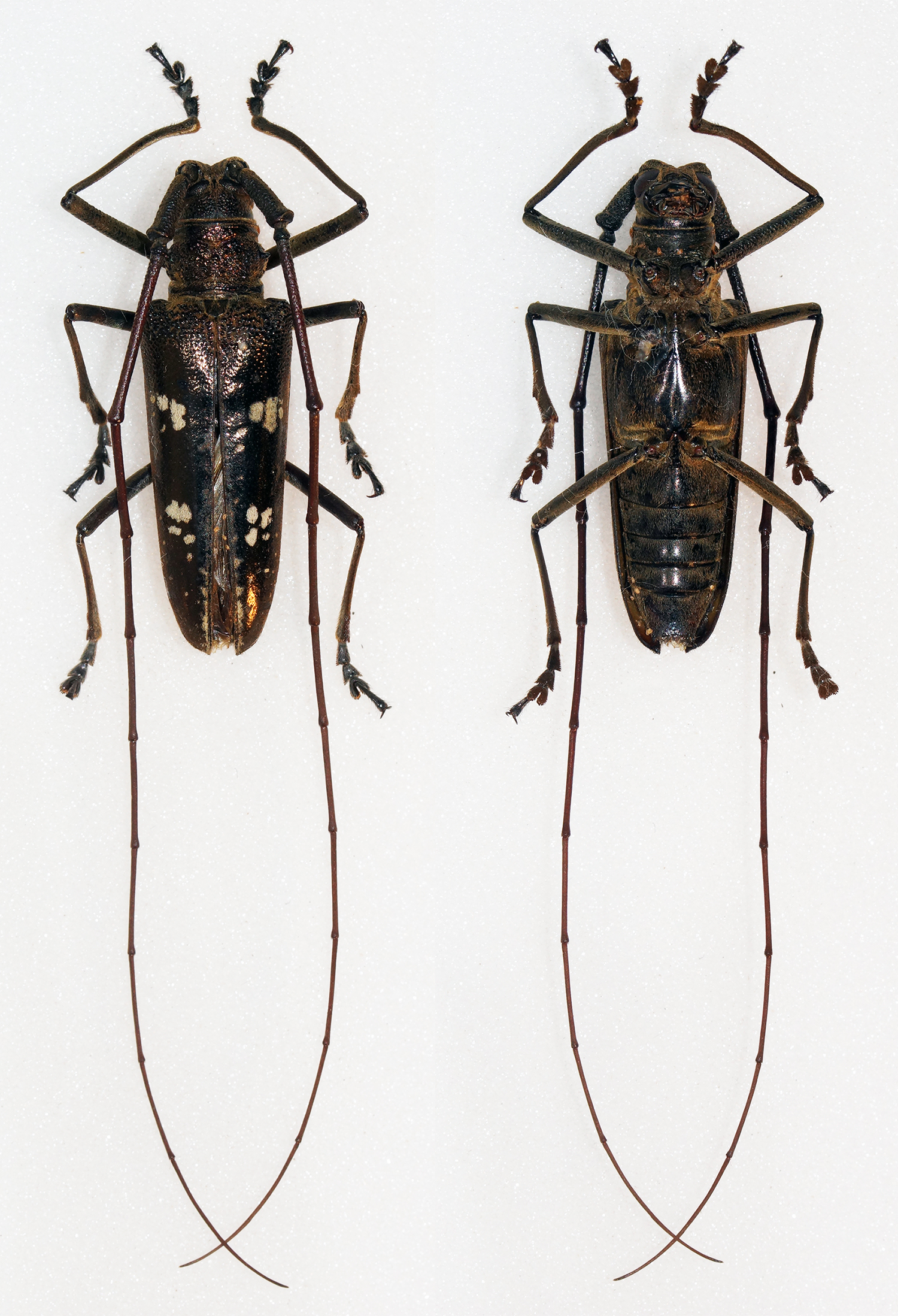

Scientific classification
- Domain: Eukaryota
- Kingdom: Animalia
- Phylum: Arthropoda
- Class: Insecta
- Order: Coleoptera
- Suborder: Polyphaga
- Infraorder: Cucujiformia
- Family: Cerambycidae
- Tribe: Lamiini
- Genus: Taeniotes
- Species: T. chapini

Binomial name
- Taeniotes chapini Dillon & Dillon, 1941

= Taeniotes chapini =

Species of beetle

Taeniotes chapini is a species of beetle in the family Cerambycidae. It was described by Dillon and Dillon in 1941. It is known from Bolivia, Ecuador and Peru.
