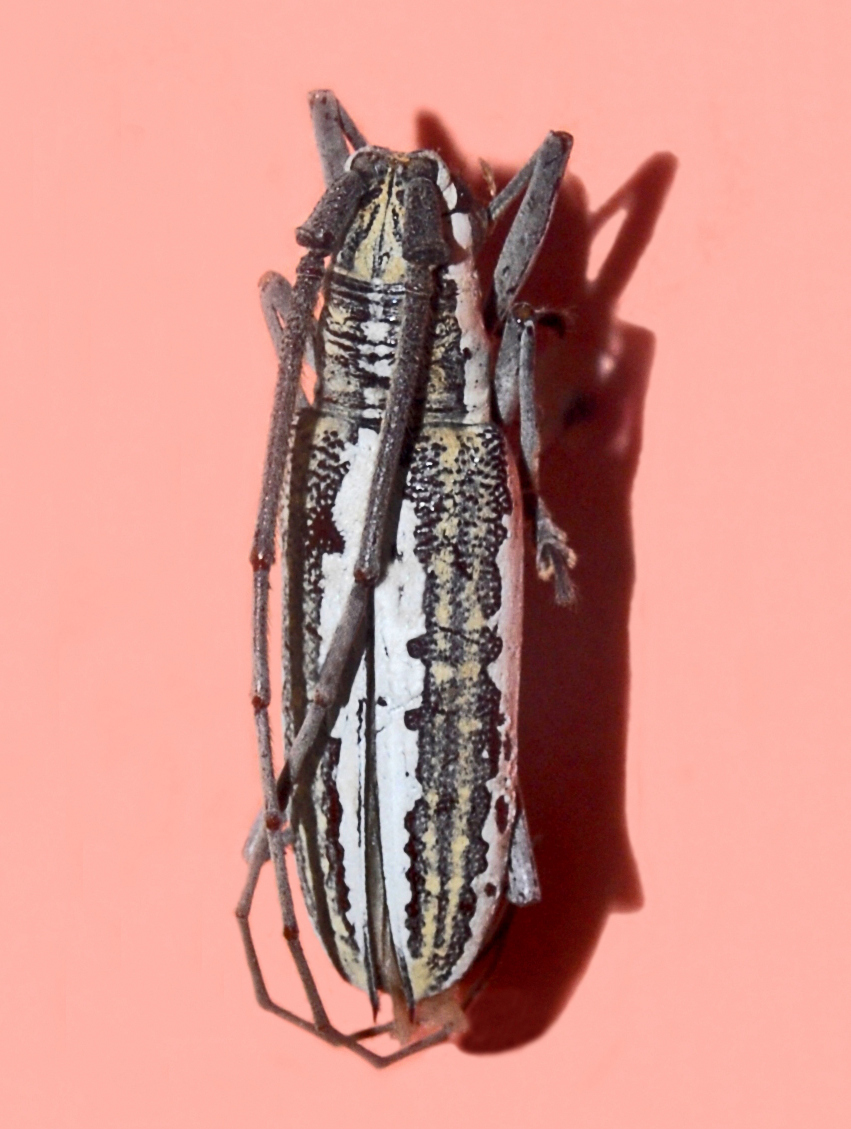
- Museum specimen of Neoptychodes trilineatus

Scientific classification
- Domain: Eukaryota
- Kingdom: Animalia
- Phylum: Arthropoda
- Class: Insecta
- Order: Coleoptera
- Suborder: Polyphaga
- Infraorder: Cucujiformia
- Family: Cerambycidae
- Subfamily: Lamiinae
- Tribe: Lamiini
- Genus: Neoptychodes; Dillon & Dillon, 1941

= Neoptychodes =

Genus of beetles

Neoptychodes is a genus of flat-faced longhorn beetles in the subfamily Lamiinae.

== Species ==
- Neoptychodes candidus (Bates, 1885)
- Neoptychodes cosmeticus Martins & Galileo, 1996
- Neoptychodes cretatus (Bates, 1872)
- Neoptychodes hondurae (White, 1858)
- Neoptychodes trilineatus (Linnaeus, 1771)
