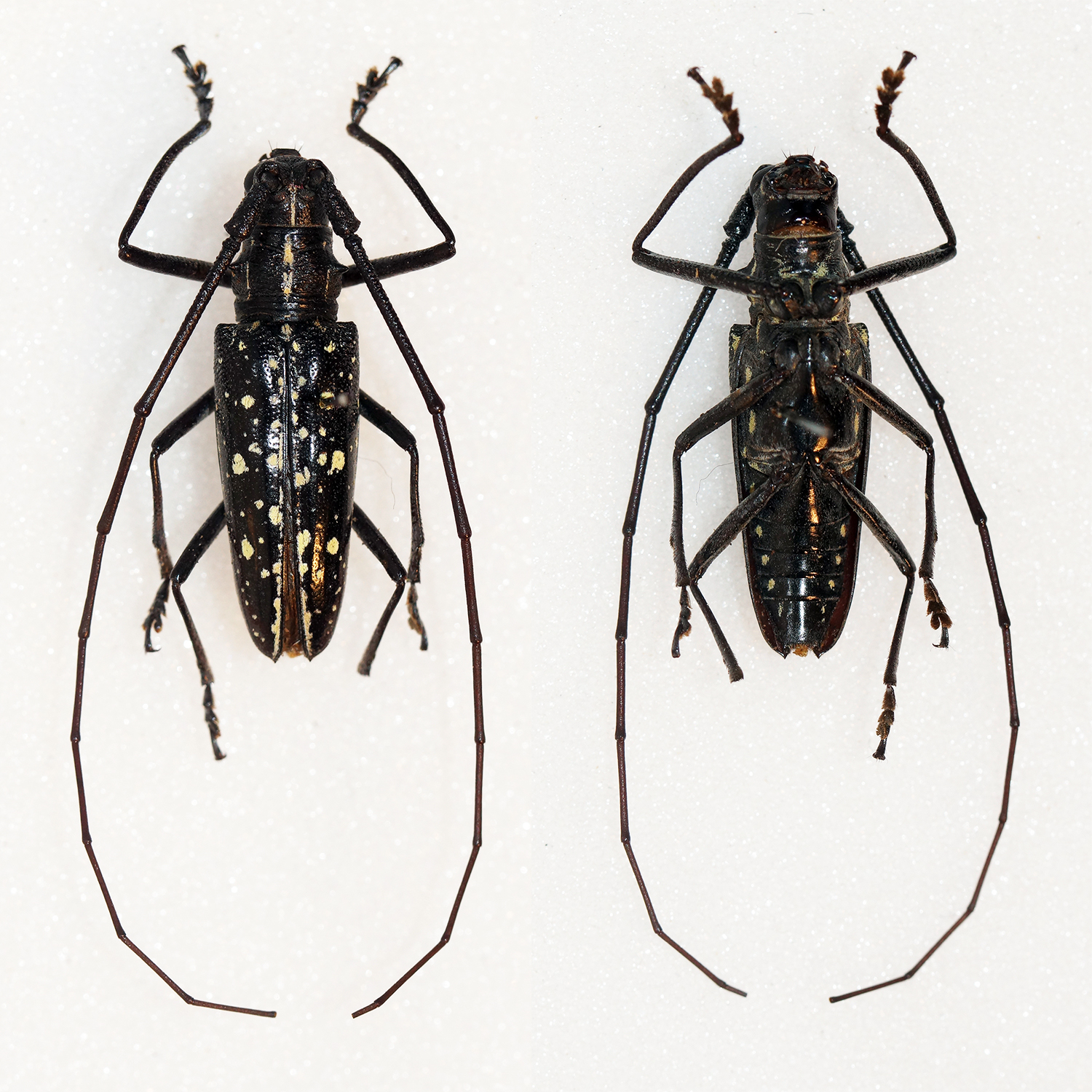

Scientific classification
- Domain: Eukaryota
- Kingdom: Animalia
- Phylum: Arthropoda
- Class: Insecta
- Order: Coleoptera
- Suborder: Polyphaga
- Infraorder: Cucujiformia
- Family: Cerambycidae
- Tribe: Lamiini
- Genus: Taeniotes
- Species: T. naevius

Binomial name
- Taeniotes naevius Bates, 1872

= Taeniotes naevius =

Species of beetle

Taeniotes naevius is a species of beetle in the family Cerambycidae. It was described by Henry Walter Bates in 1872. It is known from Ecuador, Colombia, and Peru.
