= Deliathis superba =

Scientific classification
- Domain: Eukaryota
- Kingdom: Animalia
- Phylum: Arthropoda
- Class: Insecta
- Order: Coleoptera
- Suborder: Polyphaga
- Infraorder: Cucujiformia
- Family: Cerambycidae
- Subfamily: Lamiinae
- Tribe: Monochamini
- Genus: Deliathis
- Species: D. superba

Binomial name
- Deliathis superba Franz, 1954

Synonyms
- Deliathis superbus Franz, 1954 (misspelling)

Species of beetle

Deliathis superba is a species of beetle in the family Cerambycidae. It was described by Franz in 1954, originally as D. superbus. It is known from Guatemala and El Salvador.
