= Taeniotes dentatus =

Scientific classification
- Domain: Eukaryota
- Kingdom: Animalia
- Phylum: Arthropoda
- Class: Insecta
- Order: Coleoptera
- Suborder: Polyphaga
- Infraorder: Cucujiformia
- Family: Cerambycidae
- Tribe: Lamiini
- Genus: Taeniotes
- Species: T. dentatus

Binomial name
- Taeniotes dentatus Dillon & Dillon, 1941

Species of beetle

Taeniotes dentatus is a species of beetle in the family Cerambycidae. It was described by Dillon and Dillon in 1941. It is known from Ecuador and Colombia.
