= Deliathis pulchra =

Scientific classification
- Domain: Eukaryota
- Kingdom: Animalia
- Phylum: Arthropoda
- Class: Insecta
- Order: Coleoptera
- Suborder: Polyphaga
- Infraorder: Cucujiformia
- Family: Cerambycidae
- Subfamily: Lamiinae
- Tribe: Monochamini
- Genus: Deliathis
- Species: D. pulchra

Binomial name
- Deliathis pulchra Thomson, 1865

Species of beetle

Deliathis pulchra is a species of beetle in the family Cerambycidae. It was described by James Thomson in 1865. It is known from Guatemala and Mexico.
