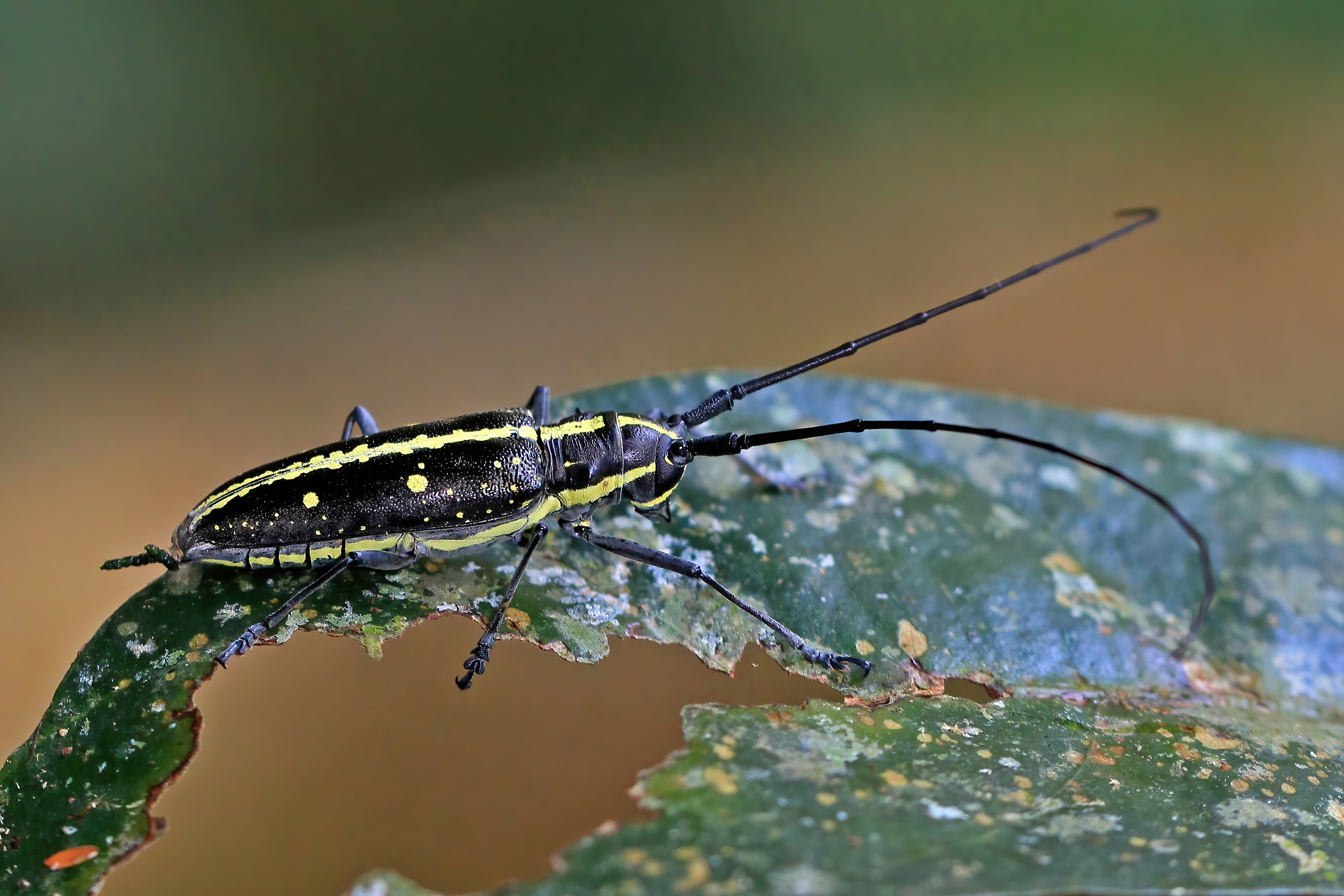
- in Brazil
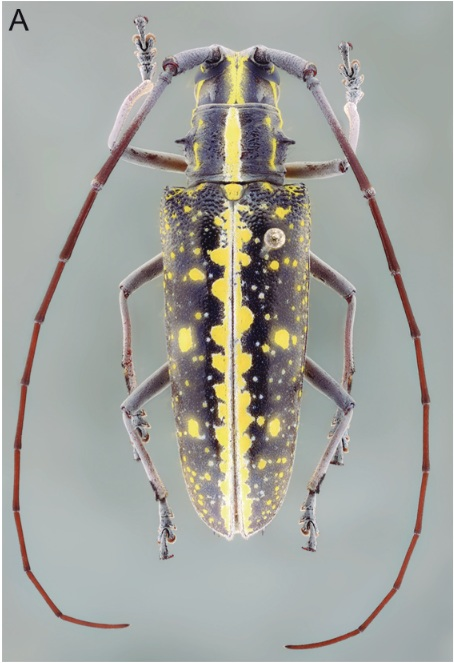

Scientific classification
- Kingdom: Animalia
- Phylum: Arthropoda
- Clade: Pancrustacea
- Class: Insecta
- Order: Coleoptera
- Suborder: Polyphaga
- Infraorder: Cucujiformia
- Family: Cerambycidae
- Genus: Taeniotes
- Species: T. amazonum

Binomial name
- Taeniotes amazonum Thomson, 1857

Synonyms
- Taeniotes scalaris var. azoricus Kolbe, 1877; Taeniotes monnei Martins & Santos-Silva, 2012

= Taeniotes amazonum =

Species of beetle

Taeniotes amazonum is a species of beetle in the family Cerambycidae. It was described by James Thomson in 1857. It is known from Bolivia, Argentina, and Brazil, and it has been introduced into the Azores.
