= Neoptychodes cosmeticus =

Scientific classification
- Domain: Eukaryota
- Kingdom: Animalia
- Phylum: Arthropoda
- Class: Insecta
- Order: Coleoptera
- Suborder: Polyphaga
- Infraorder: Cucujiformia
- Family: Cerambycidae
- Tribe: Lamiini
- Genus: Neoptychodes
- Species: N. cosmeticus

Binomial name
- Neoptychodes cosmeticus Martins & Galileo, 1996

Species of beetle

Neoptychodes cosmeticus is a species of beetle in the family Cerambycidae. It was described by Martins and Galileo in 1996. It is known from Ecuador and Colombia.
