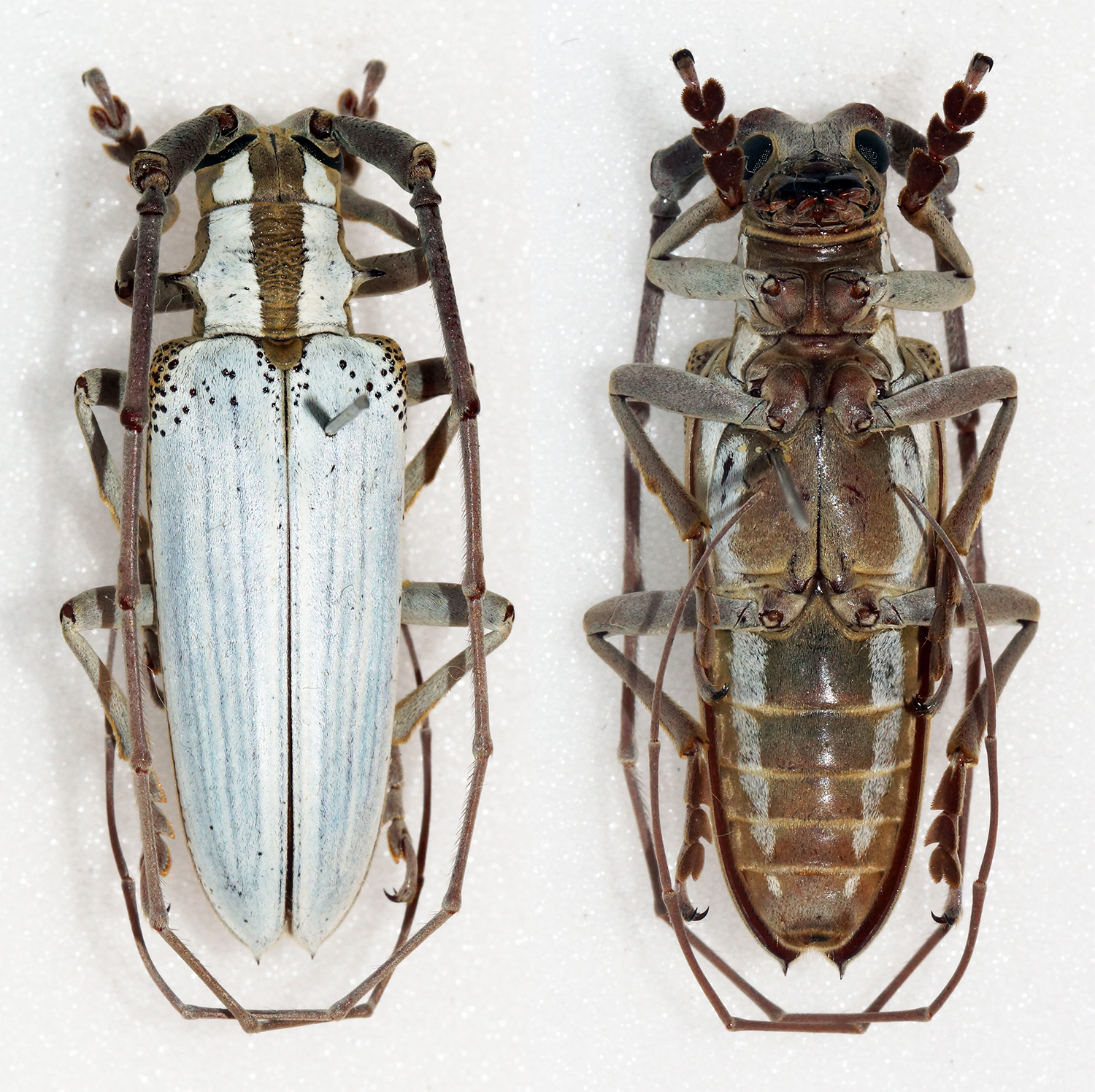

Scientific classification
- Kingdom: Animalia
- Phylum: Arthropoda
- Class: Insecta
- Order: Coleoptera
- Suborder: Polyphaga
- Infraorder: Cucujiformia
- Family: Cerambycidae
- Genus: Deliathis
- Species: D. imperator

Binomial name
- Deliathis imperator (Thomson, 1868)

Synonyms
- Hammoderus imperator Thomson, 1868; Plagiohammus imperator (Thomson, 1868); Taeniotes imperator (Thomson, 1868); Deliathis albida Linsley, 1935; Deliathus albidus Linsley, 1935; Deliathis imperatrix Santos-Silva & Botero, 2018 (Missp.)

= Deliathis imperator =

Species of beetle

Deliathis imperator is a species of beetle in the family Cerambycidae. It was described by James Thomson in 1868. It is known from Mexico. The species name is sometimes misspelled as "imperatrix" (e.g.).
