= Taeniotes inquinatus =

Scientific classification
- Domain: Eukaryota
- Kingdom: Animalia
- Phylum: Arthropoda
- Class: Insecta
- Order: Coleoptera
- Suborder: Polyphaga
- Infraorder: Cucujiformia
- Family: Cerambycidae
- Tribe: Lamiini
- Genus: Taeniotes
- Species: T. inquinatus

Binomial name
- Taeniotes inquinatus Thomson, 1857

Species of beetle

Taeniotes inquinatus is a species of beetle in the family Cerambycidae. It was described by James Thomson in 1857. It is known from Ecuador, Costa Rica, Panama, Colombia, and Venezuela.
