= Taeniotes parafarinosus =

Scientific classification
- Kingdom: Animalia
- Phylum: Arthropoda
- Clade: Pancrustacea
- Class: Insecta
- Order: Coleoptera
- Suborder: Polyphaga
- Infraorder: Cucujiformia
- Family: Cerambycidae
- Genus: Taeniotes
- Species: T. parafarinosus

Binomial name
- Taeniotes parafarinosus (Olivier, 1790)

Synonyms
- Monochamus pulverulentus (Olivier, 1790); Taeniotes guttularis Schwarzer, 1929; Taeniotes farinosus m. guttularis Schwarzer, 1929; Taeniotes parafarinosus Breuning, 1971; Taeniotes pulverulenta (Olivier, 1790); Cerambyx surinamensis maculosus Voet, 1806; Cerambyx pulverulentus Olivier, 1790 nec Scopoli, 1772; Stenochorus pulverulentus (Olivier, 1790)

Species of beetle

Taeniotes parafarinosus is a species of beetle in the family Cerambycidae. It was described by Guillaume-Antoine Olivier in 1790. It is known from Peru, Brazil, Costa Rica, Panama, French Guiana, Bolivia, Guyana, and Suriname. It has also been introduced into Guadeloupe.
