= Neoptychodes hondurae =

Scientific classification
- Domain: Eukaryota
- Kingdom: Animalia
- Phylum: Arthropoda
- Class: Insecta
- Order: Coleoptera
- Suborder: Polyphaga
- Infraorder: Cucujiformia
- Family: Cerambycidae
- Tribe: Lamiini
- Genus: Neoptychodes
- Species: N. hondurae

Binomial name
- Neoptychodes hondurae (White, 1858)

Species of beetle

Neoptychodes hondurae is a species of beetle in the family Cerambycidae. It was described by White in 1858.

== Subspecies ==
- Neoptychodes hondurae hondurae (White, 1858)
- Neoptychodes hondurae trivittatus (Taschenberg, 1870)
