= Deliathis nigrovittata =

Scientific classification
- Kingdom: Animalia
- Phylum: Arthropoda
- Class: Insecta
- Order: Coleoptera
- Suborder: Polyphaga
- Infraorder: Cucujiformia
- Family: Cerambycidae
- Subfamily: Lamiinae
- Tribe: Monochamini
- Genus: Deliathis
- Species: D. nigrovittata

Binomial name
- Deliathis nigrovittata Breuning, 1980

Species of beetle

Deliathis nigrovittata is a species of beetle in the family Cerambycidae. It was described by Stephan von Breuning in 1980. It is known from Mexico.
