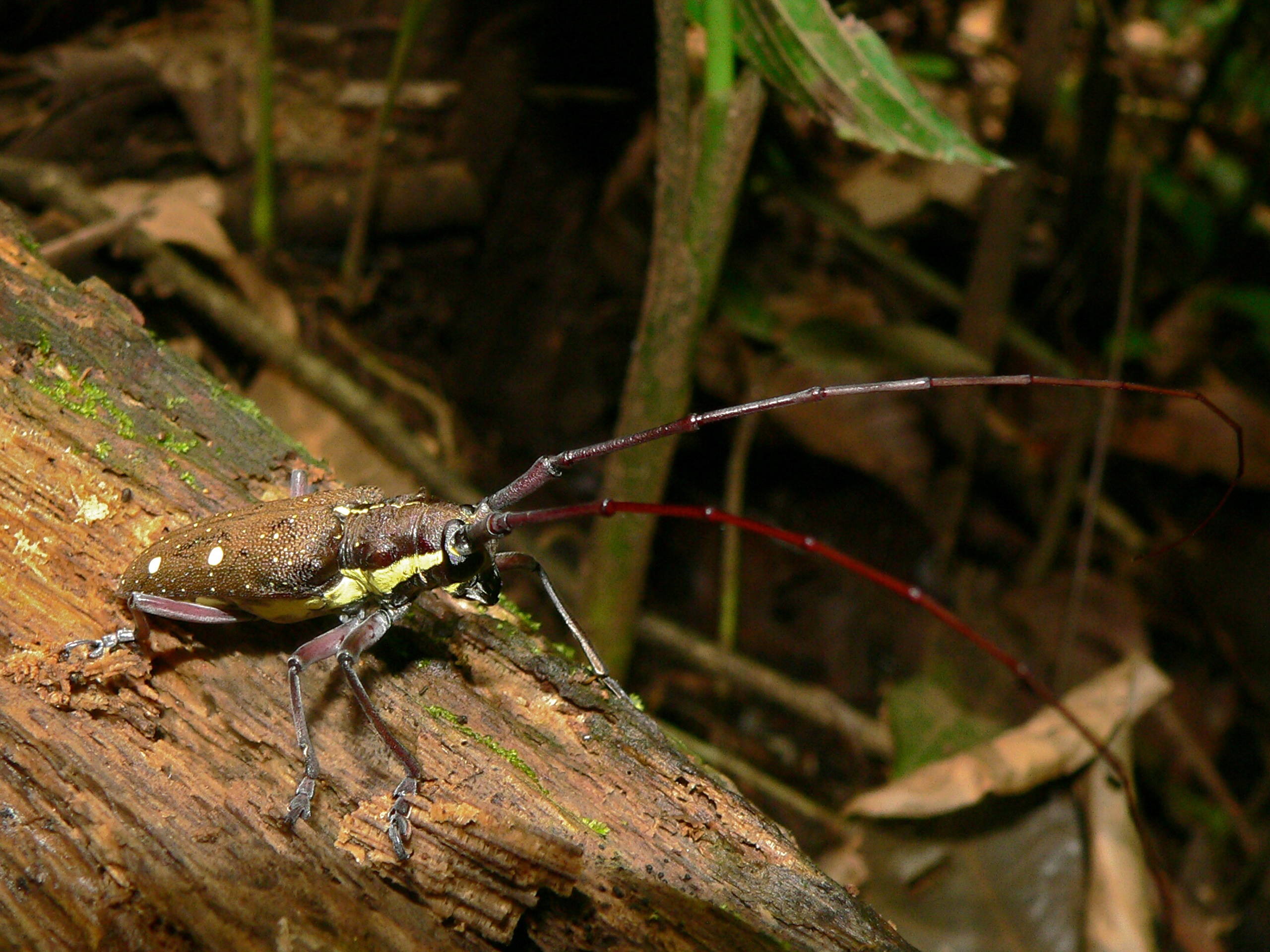
- Taeniotes xanthostictus

Scientific classification
- Domain: Eukaryota
- Kingdom: Animalia
- Phylum: Arthropoda
- Class: Insecta
- Order: Coleoptera
- Suborder: Polyphaga
- Infraorder: Cucujiformia
- Family: Cerambycidae
- Tribe: Lamiini
- Genus: Taeniotes
- Species: T. xanthostictus

Binomial name
- Taeniotes xanthostictus Bates, 1880

Synonyms
- Taeniotes xanthostictus var. zunilensis Bates, 1885; Taeniotes luciani ? Bates, 1872; Taeniotes zunilensis Bates, 1885

= Taeniotes xanthostictus =

Species of beetle

Taeniotes xanthostictus is a species of beetle in the family Cerambycidae. It was described by Henry Walter Bates in 1880. It is known from Mexico to Colombia, Ecuador and Peru.
