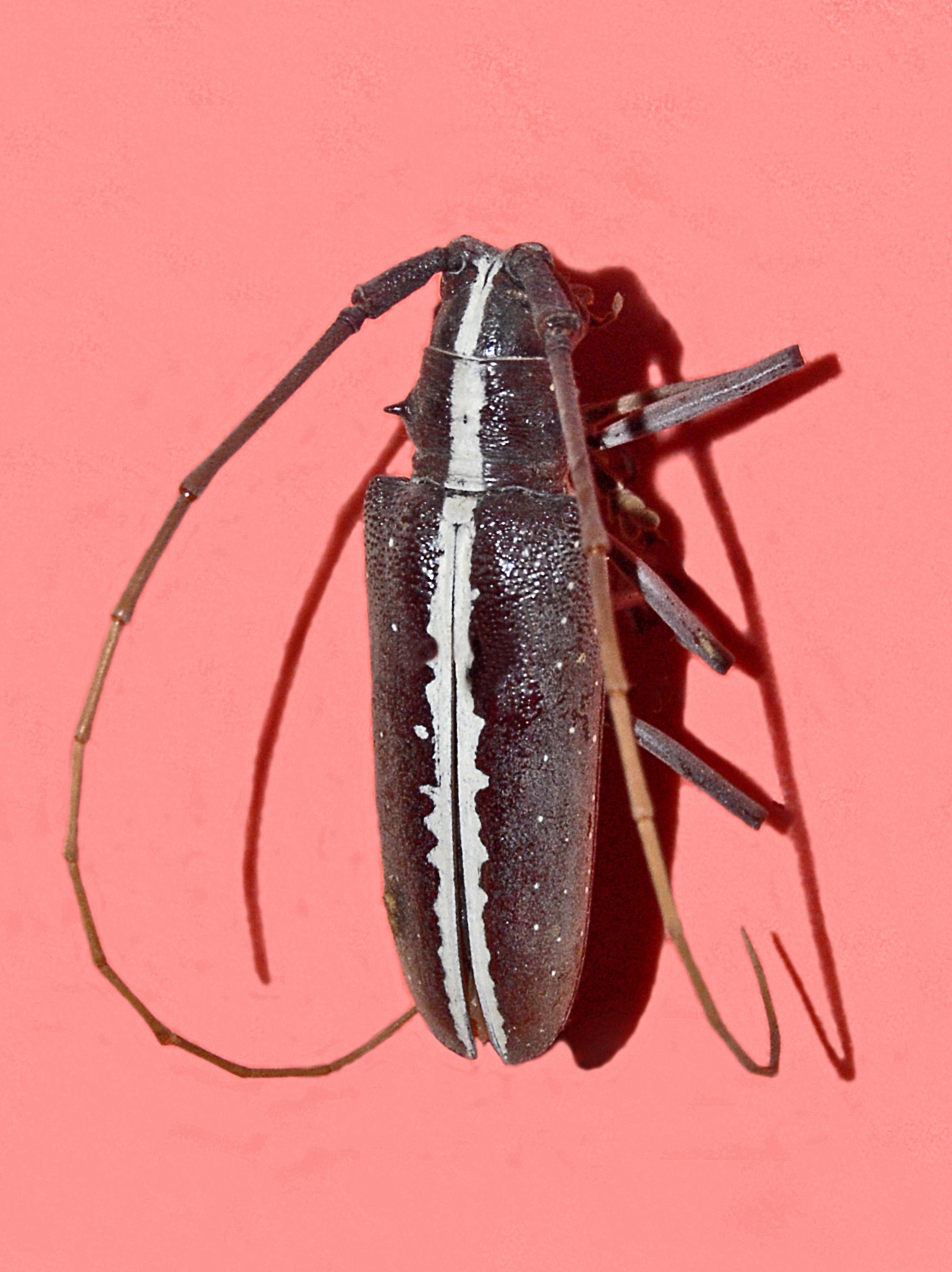
- Museum specimen of Taeniotes scalatus

Scientific classification
- Kingdom: Animalia
- Phylum: Arthropoda
- Clade: Pancrustacea
- Class: Insecta
- Order: Coleoptera
- Suborder: Polyphaga
- Infraorder: Cucujiformia
- Family: Cerambycidae
- Genus: Taeniotes
- Species: T. scalatus

Binomial name
- Taeniotes scalatus (Gmelin, 1790)

Synonyms
- Cerambyx scalaris Fabricius, 1781 nec Linnaeus, 1758; Cerambyx scalatus Gmelin, 1790; Taeniotes scalaris (Fabricius) Lacordaire, 1869; Taeniotes scalaris var. azoricus Kolbe, 1877; Taeniotes suturalis Thomson, 1857

= Taeniotes scalatus =

Species of beetle

Taeniotes scalatus is a species of flat-faced longhorn beetle in the subfamily Lamiinae of the family Cerambycidae.

== Description ==
Taeniotes scalatus can reach a length of 30–40 millimetres (1.2–1.6 in). Basic color of body is black, with a yellow dorsal streak and small spots. Larval host plants are cultivated figs (Ficus carica), Artocarpus altilis, Artocarpus integrifolius, Brosimum utile, Castilla elastica, Morus alba and Coffea arabica. These nocturnal flat-faced longhorn beetles can be found all year round, especially from March to June.

== Distribution ==
This species is very common and widely distributed in the Azores, in the Nearctic realm, in Mexico, and in Central America and northern South America (Belize, Bolivia, Costa Rica, Colombia, Ecuador, Guatemala, Honduras, Nicaragua, Panama and Venezuela).

== Bibliography ==
- Miguel A. Monné (2005): Catalogue of the Cerambycidae (Coleoptera) of the Neotropical Region. Part II. Subfamily Lamiinae
- Tavakilian, G. and Chevillotte, H. (2012) Titan: base de données internationales sur les Cerambycidae ou Longicornes.
