= Taeniotes marmoratus =

Scientific classification
- Domain: Eukaryota
- Kingdom: Animalia
- Phylum: Arthropoda
- Class: Insecta
- Order: Coleoptera
- Suborder: Polyphaga
- Infraorder: Cucujiformia
- Family: Cerambycidae
- Tribe: Lamiini
- Genus: Taeniotes
- Species: T. marmoratus

Binomial name
- Taeniotes marmoratus Thomson, 1865

Species of beetle

Taeniotes marmoratus is a species of beetle in the family Cerambycidae. It was described by James Thomson in 1865. It is known from Ecuador.
