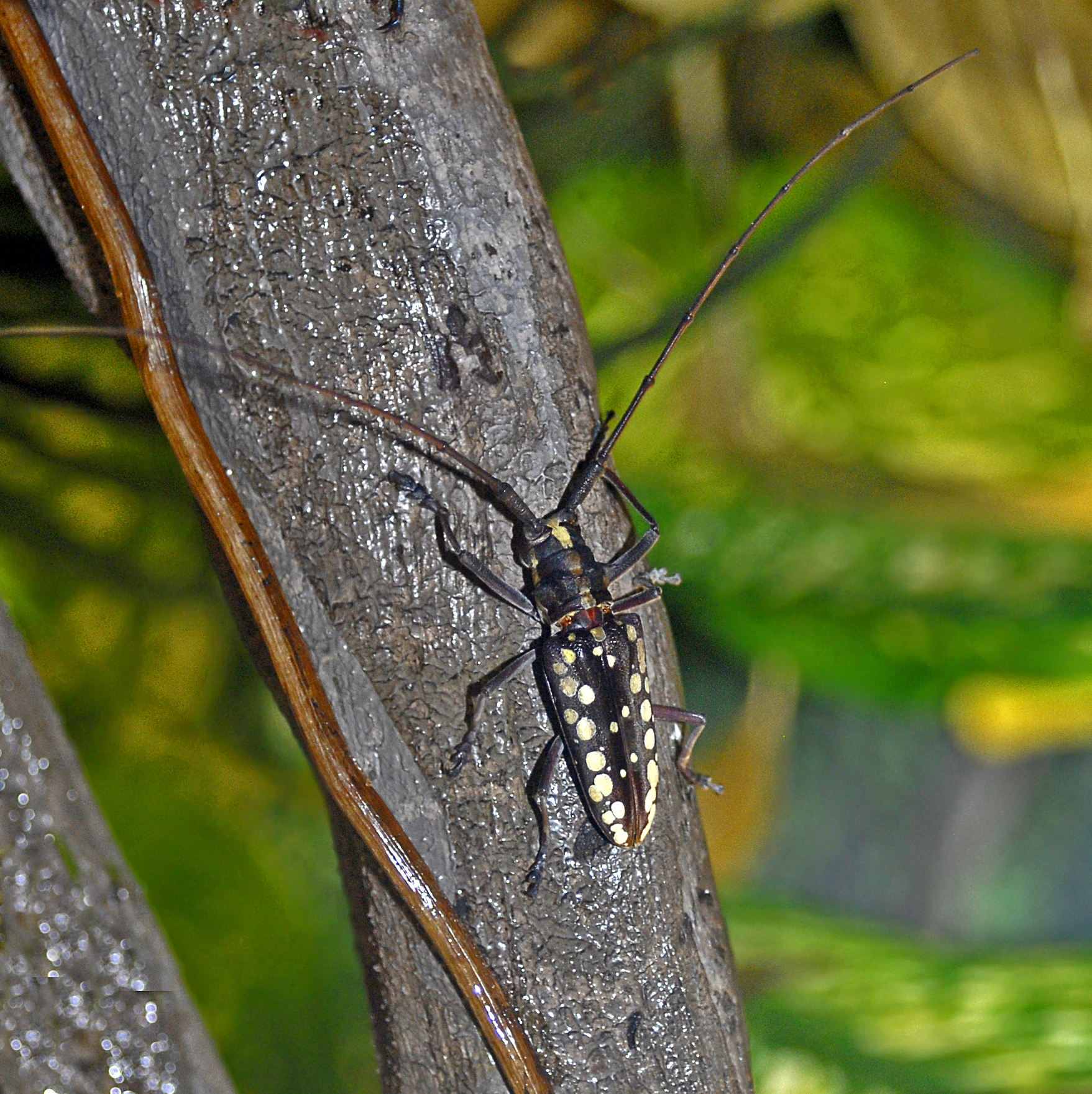

Scientific classification
- Kingdom: Animalia
- Phylum: Arthropoda
- Class: Insecta
- Order: Coleoptera
- Suborder: Polyphaga
- Infraorder: Cucujiformia
- Family: Cerambycidae
- Genus: Taeniotes
- Species: T. farinosus

Binomial name
- Taeniotes farinosus (Linnaeus, 1758)

Synonyms
- Monochamus farinosus (Linnaeus, 1758); Monochamus decoratus Laporte de Castelnau, 1840; Cerambyx ocellatus Fabricius, 1801; Cerambyx farinosus Linnaeus, 1758; Cerambyx farinosus var. DeGeer, 1775; Cerambyx subocellatus Olivier, 1792; Taeniotes decoratus (Laporte de Castelnau, 1840); Taeniotes farinosa (Linnaeus, 1758); Taeniotes subocellatus (Olivier, 1792)

= Taeniotes farinosus =

Species of beetle

Taeniotes farinosus is a species of beetle in the family Cerambycidae. It was described by Carl Linnaeus in 1758, originally under the genus Cerambyx.

== Distribution ==
This species is known from Colombia, Brazil, Guyana, French Guiana, Suriname, Argentina, Bolivia, Costa Rica, Ecuador, Guadeloupe, Martinique, Paraguay and Peru.

== Description ==
Taeniotes farinosus can reach a body length of about 25–33 mm (0.98–1.30 in). Body is elongate, black or dark brown, with a series of yellow-orange spots on the elytra. Antennae are filiform and rather long. Pronotum is approximately subquadrate.

== Biology ==
This species may have two generations per year (bivoltine). Adults can be found from January to March and from September to December. These beetles feed on Artocarpus altilis (breadfruit). Larvae usually drill into wood and can cause damages.

== Bibliography ==
- Laporte Francis Louis Nompar de Caumont, Comte de Castelnau (1840) Histoire Naturelle des Insectes Coléoptères, P. Duménil, Paris 2
- Linné Carl (1767) Systema Naturæ, Editio Duodecima Reformata. Laurent Salvius, Holmiæ 1 (2): 533–1327.
- Ubirajara R. Martins and Antonio Santos-Silva On some species of Taeniotes Audinet-Serville, 1835(Coleoptera: Cerambycidae: Lamiinae) Pacific Coast Entomological Society
