= Deliathis bifurcata =

Scientific classification
- Domain: Eukaryota
- Kingdom: Animalia
- Phylum: Arthropoda
- Class: Insecta
- Order: Coleoptera
- Suborder: Polyphaga
- Infraorder: Cucujiformia
- Family: Cerambycidae
- Subfamily: Lamiinae
- Tribe: Monochamini
- Genus: Deliathis
- Species: D. bifurcata

Binomial name
- Deliathis bifurcata Dillon & Dillon, 1941

Synonyms
- Deliathis bifurcatus Dillon & Dillon, 1941 (misspelling)

Species of beetle

Deliathis bifurcata is a species of beetle in the family Cerambycidae. It was described by Dillon and Dillon in 1941. It is known from Honduras and El Salvador.
