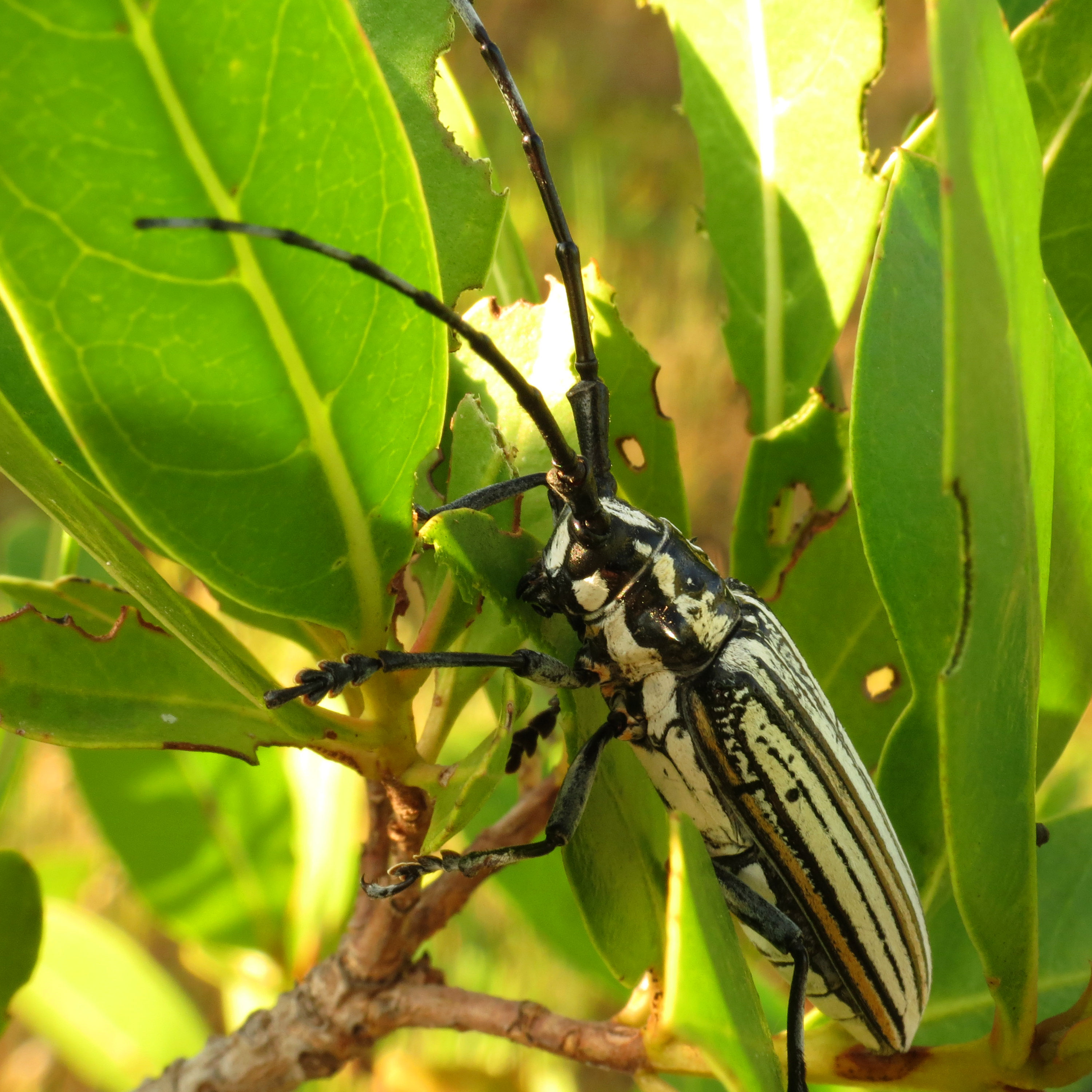

Scientific classification
- Domain: Eukaryota
- Kingdom: Animalia
- Phylum: Arthropoda
- Class: Insecta
- Order: Coleoptera
- Suborder: Polyphaga
- Infraorder: Cucujiformia
- Family: Cerambycidae
- Subfamily: Lamiinae
- Tribe: Monochamini
- Genus: Deliathis
- Species: D. incana

Binomial name
- Deliathis incana (Forster, 1771)

Synonyms
- Cerambyx incanus Forster, 1771; Lamia vittator Fabricius, 1775; Cerambyx vittator (Fabricius, 1775); Deliathis vittator (Fabricius, 1775); Cerambyx magnificus Voet, 1781 (Unav.)

= Deliathis incana =

Species of beetle

Deliathis incana is a species of beetle in the family Cerambycidae. It was described by Forster in 1771.
