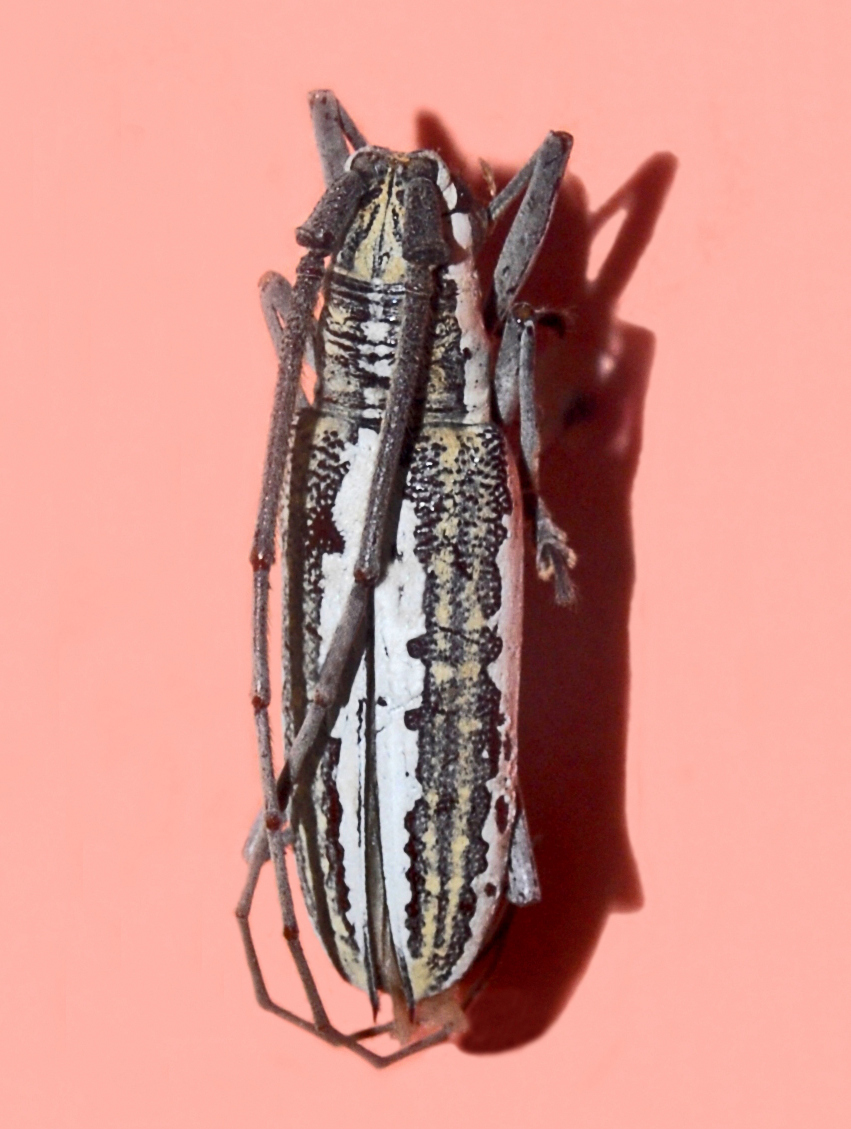
- Museum specimen

Scientific classification
- Kingdom: Animalia
- Phylum: Arthropoda
- Clade: Pancrustacea
- Class: Insecta
- Order: Coleoptera
- Suborder: Polyphaga
- Infraorder: Cucujiformia
- Family: Cerambycidae
- Genus: Neoptychodes
- Species: N. trilineatus

Binomial name
- Neoptychodes trilineatus (Linnaeus, 1771)

Synonyms
- Numerous: Neoptychodes trilineata Zayas, 1975; Saperda vittata Zimsen, 1964 Neoptychodes insularis Breuning, 1961; Ptychodes trilineatus Craighead, 1950; Neoptychodes trilineatus var. insularis Knull, 1948; Ptychodes trilineatus Risbec, 1946; Ptychodes trilineatus Risbec, 1946; Phychodes trilineatus Sherman, 1946; Neoptychodes trilineatus var. insularis Blackwelder, 1946; Neoptychodes trilineata Blackwelder, 1946; Ptychodes trilineatus Löding, 1945; Taeniotes trilineatus Breuning, 1943; Taeniotes insularis Breuning, 1943; Ptychodes fairmairei Breuning, 1943; Neoptychodes trilineatus var. insularis Dillon & Dillon, 1941; Ptychodes trilineatus Martorell, 1939; Ptychodes trilineatus Martorell & Salas, 1939; Ptychodes trilineator Le Beau, 1938; Ptychodes trilineatus Doane & al., 1936; Ptychodes trilineatus Löding, 1933; Ptychodes trilineatus Gowdey, 1926; Ptychodes trilineatus Craighead, 1923; Ptychodes trilineatus var. insularis Aurivillius, 1922; Ptychodes trilineatus Aurivillius, 1922; Ptychodes fairmairei Aurivillius, 1922; Ptychodes abbreviatus Aurivillius, 1922; Ptychodes trilineatus Ritchie, 1918; Ptychodes trilineatus Garnett, 1918; Ptychodes trilineatus Horton, 1917; Ptychodes trilineatus Leng & Mutchler, 1914; Ptychodes trilineatus Thomas Lincoln Casey, Jr., 1913; Ptychodes trilineatus Mason, 1910; Ptychodes vittatus Schaeffer, 1908; Ptychodes trilineatus Heyne & Taschenberg, 1908; Ptychodes trivittatus Morgan, 1897; Ptychodes trilineatus Leng & Hamilton, 1896; Ptychodes trilineatus Pittier & Biolley, 1895; Ptychodes trilineatus Gahan, 1895; Ptychodes trilineatus Horn, 1894; Ptychodes vittatus Riley & Howard, 1893; Ptychodes trilineatus Thomas Lincoln Casey, Jr., 1893; Ptychodes abbreviatus Thomas Lincoln Casey, Jr., 1893; Ptychodes 3-vittatus Riley & Howard, 1892; Ptychodes trilineatus Gundlach, 1891; Ptychodes trilineatus Bates, 1885; Ptychodes vittatus Shufeldt, 1884; Ptychodes trilineatus Bates, 1880; Ptychodes trilineatus Waterhouse, 1878; Ptychodes fairmairei Thomson, 1878; Ptychodes trilineatus var. insularis Gemminger & Harold, 1873; Ptychodes trilineatus Gemminger & Harold, 1873; Ptychodes fairmairei Gemminger & Harold, 1873; Ptychodes trilineatus Bates, 1872; Ptychodes trilineatus Chenu, 1870; Ptychodes trilineatus Lacordaire, 1869; Ptychodes trilineatus Redtenbacher, 1868; Ptychodes trilineatus Rojas, 1866; Ptychodes trilineatus Pascoe, 1866; Ptychodes fairmairei Thomson, 1865; Ptychodes trilineatus Chevrolat, 1862; Ptychoderes 3-lineatus Chevrolat, 1861; Ptychodes vittatus Thomson, 1860; Ptychodes insularis Thomson, 1860; Hetoemis trilineata Thomson, 1860; Ptychodes trilineatus LeConte, 1852; Ptychodes insularis Fairmaire, 1850; Ptychodes trilineatus Gosse, 1848; Ptychodes vittatus Haldeman, 1847; Ptychodes trilineatus Laporte, 1840; Saperda trilineata Drury & Westwood, 1837; Ptychodes vittatus Dejean, 1835; Saperda vittata Schönherr, 1817; Saperda vittata Fabricius, 1801; Saperda vittata Fabricius, 1793; Cerambyx trilineatus Olivier, 1790; Cerambyx (saperda) trilineatus Gmelin, 1790; Saperda vittata Fabricius, 1787; Stenocorus trilineatus Fabricius, 1781; Saperda vittata Fabricius, 1781; Saperda vittata Fabricius, 1776; Stenocorus trilineatus Fabricius, 1775; Cerambyx trilineatus Drury, 1772; Cerambyx trilineatus Linné, 1771

= Neoptychodes trilineatus =

Species of beetle

Neoptychodes trilineatus is a species of flat-faced longhorn beetles in the subfamily Lamiinae.

== Description ==
Neoptychodes trilineatus can reach a length of about 21–35 millimetres (0.83–1.38 in) in males, of about 19–31 millimetres (0.75–1.22 in) in the females. The body coloration is quite variable through the wide range of this species. Usually the background is greyish or dark brown with orange-brown elytral spots and three white or yellow longitudinal bands (hence the Latin name trilineatus). Main host plants are Ficus carica, Morus microphylla, Salix sp. and Alnus sp.

== Distribution ==
This species can be found in Belize, Costa Rica, Cuba, Guatemala, Guyana, Honduras, Nicaragua, Suriname, United States and Venezuela.
