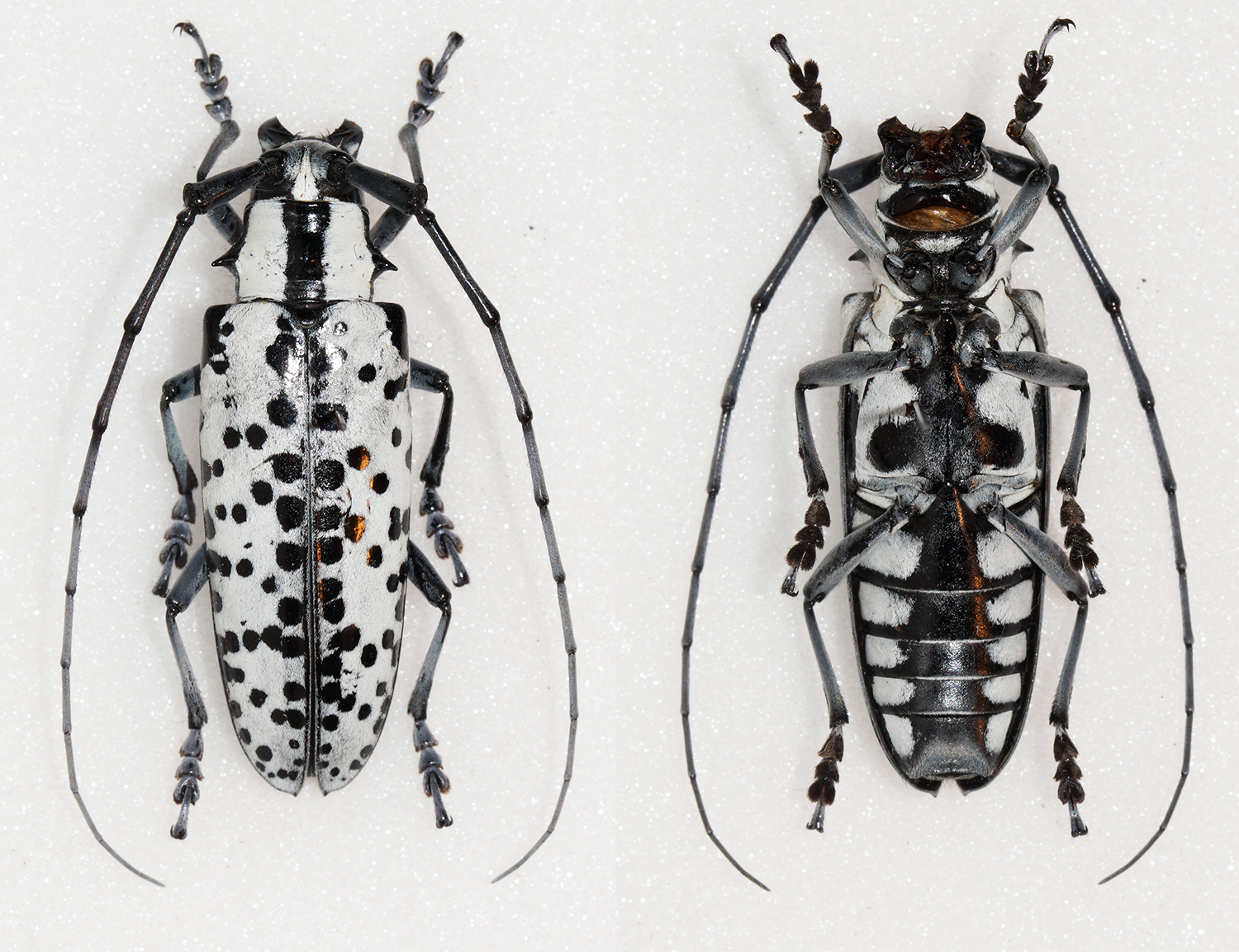

Scientific classification
- Domain: Eukaryota
- Kingdom: Animalia
- Phylum: Arthropoda
- Class: Insecta
- Order: Coleoptera
- Suborder: Polyphaga
- Infraorder: Cucujiformia
- Family: Cerambycidae
- Subfamily: Lamiinae
- Tribe: Monochamini
- Genus: Deliathis
- Species: D. nivea

Binomial name
- Deliathis nivea Bates, 1869

= Deliathis nivea =

Species of beetle

Deliathis nivea is a species of beetle in the family Cerambycidae. It was described by Henry Walter Bates in 1869. It is known from Nicaragua, Guatemala, Costa Rica, Honduras, and Panama.

== Varietas ==
- Deliathis nivea var. detersa Bates, 1885
- Deliathis nivea var. femelle Bates, 1885
- Deliathis nivea var. inermis Aurivillius, 1922
