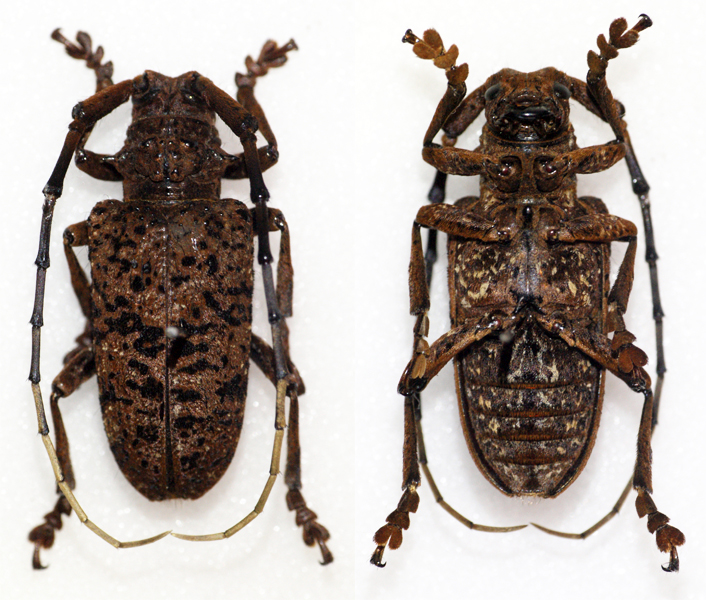

Scientific classification
- Domain: Eukaryota
- Kingdom: Animalia
- Phylum: Arthropoda
- Class: Insecta
- Order: Coleoptera
- Suborder: Polyphaga
- Infraorder: Cucujiformia
- Family: Cerambycidae
- Tribe: Lamiini
- Genus: Aristobia
- Species: A. hispida

Binomial name
- Aristobia hispida (Saunders, 1853)

Synonyms
- Cerosterna hispida Saunders, 1853

= Aristobia hispida =

Species of beetle

Aristobia hispida is a species of beetle in the family Cerambycidae. It was described by Saunders in 1853, originally under the genus Cerosterna. It is known from Taiwan, China and Vietnam.
