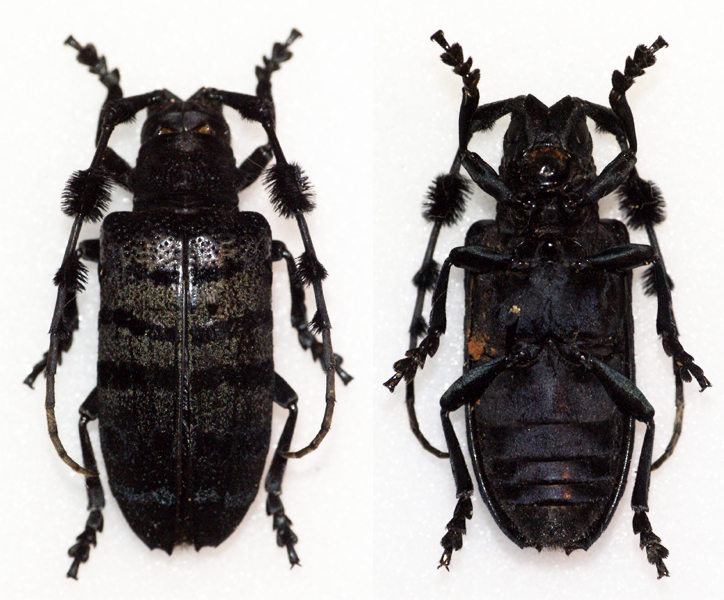

Scientific classification
- Kingdom: Animalia
- Phylum: Arthropoda
- Class: Insecta
- Order: Coleoptera
- Suborder: Polyphaga
- Infraorder: Cucujiformia
- Family: Cerambycidae
- Genus: Aristobia
- Species: A. umbrosa

Binomial name
- Aristobia umbrosa (Thomson, 1865)

Synonyms
- Aristobia pendleburyi Fisher, 1935; Celosterna umbrosa Thomson, 1865; Eunithera viduata (Pascoe, 1868); Thysia viduata Pascoe, 1868

= Aristobia umbrosa =

Species of beetle

Aristobia umbrosa is a species of beetle in the family Cerambycidae. It was described by James Thomson in 1865, originally under the genus Celosterna. It is known from Malaysia, Borneo and Sumatra. It contains the varietas Aristobia umbrosa var. variefasciata.
