= Cerosterna ritsemai =

Scientific classification
- Domain: Eukaryota
- Kingdom: Animalia
- Phylum: Arthropoda
- Class: Insecta
- Order: Coleoptera
- Suborder: Polyphaga
- Infraorder: Cucujiformia
- Family: Cerambycidae
- Genus: Cerosterna
- Species: C. ritsemai

Binomial name
- Cerosterna ritsemai Heller, 1907

Species of beetle

Cerosterna ritsemai is a species of beetle in the family Cerambycidae. It was described by Karl Maria Heller in 1907. It is known from Sumatra (Indonesia) and Malaysia.

Cerosterna ritsemai measure about 36–39 mm (1.4–1.5 in) in length.
