= Aristobia quadrifasciata =

Scientific classification
- Domain: Eukaryota
- Kingdom: Animalia
- Phylum: Arthropoda
- Class: Insecta
- Order: Coleoptera
- Suborder: Polyphaga
- Infraorder: Cucujiformia
- Family: Cerambycidae
- Tribe: Lamiini
- Genus: Aristobia
- Species: A. quadrifasciata

Binomial name
- Aristobia quadrifasciata Aurivillius, 1916

Synonyms
- Aristobia umbrosa var. quadrifasciata Aurivillius, 1916

Species of beetle

Aristobia quadrifasciata is a species of beetle in the family Cerambycidae. It was described by Per Olof Christopher Aurivillius in 1916 and is known from Sumatra and Malaysia.

== Subspecies ==
- Aristobia quadrifasciata malasiaca Jiroux, Garreau, Bentanachs & Prévost, 2014
- Aristobia quadrifasciata quadrifasciata Aurivillius, 1916
