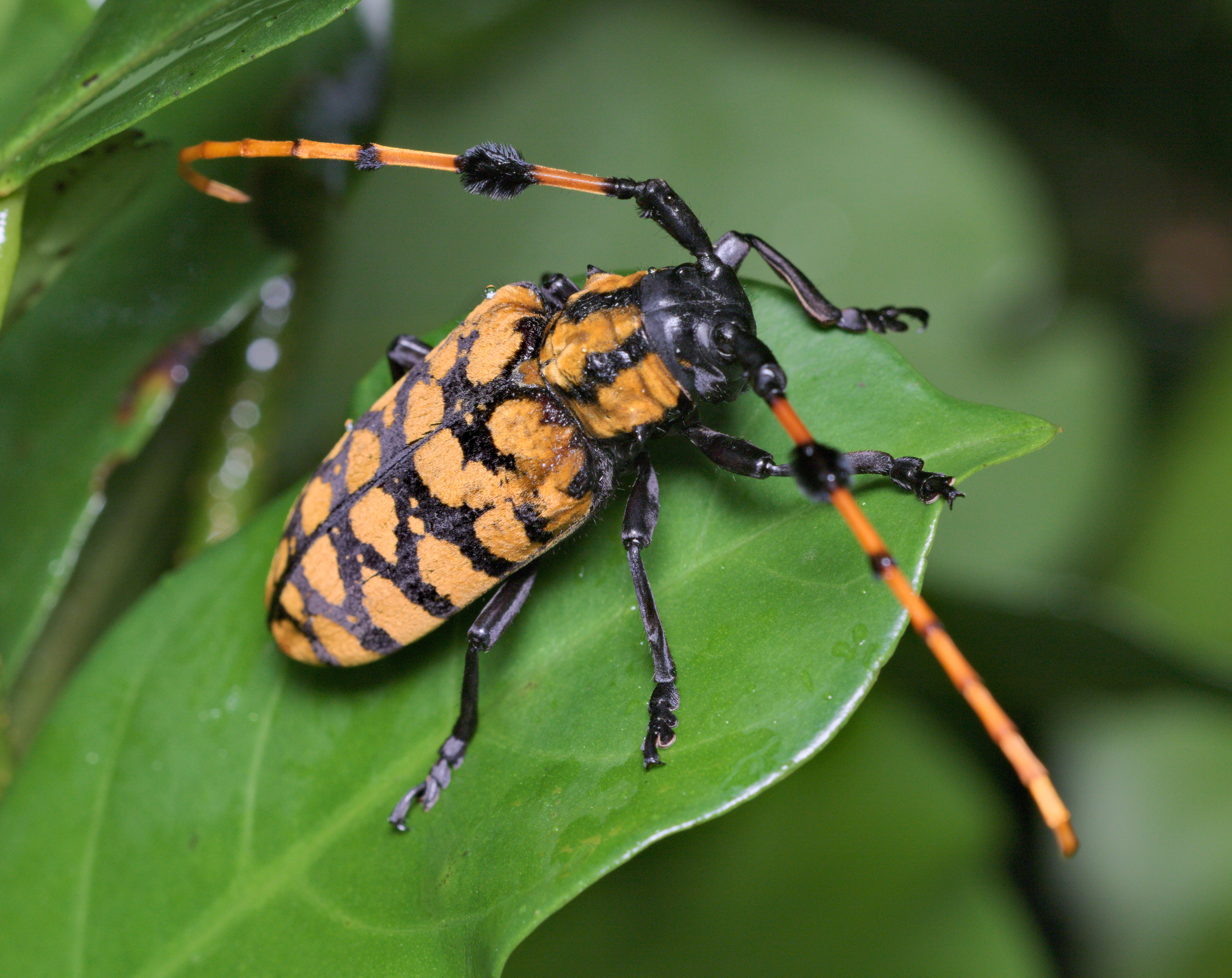
- A. reticulator from Hong Kong

Scientific classification
- Domain: Eukaryota
- Kingdom: Animalia
- Phylum: Arthropoda
- Class: Insecta
- Order: Coleoptera
- Suborder: Polyphaga
- Infraorder: Cucujiformia
- Family: Cerambycidae
- Tribe: Lamiini
- Genus: Aristobia
- Species: A. reticulator

Binomial name
- Aristobia reticulator (Fabricius, 1781)

Synonyms
- Lamia reticulator Fabricius, 1781; Cerambyx testudo Voet, 1778 (Unav.); Celosterna clathrator Thomson, 1865; Batocera reticulator; Cerambyx reticulator; Aristobia testudo

= Aristobia reticulator =

Species of beetle

Aristobia reticulator is a species of beetle in the family Cerambycidae. It is known from Bhutan, Myanmar, India, China, Laos, Bangladesh, Thailand, and Vietnam. It feeds on Prunus persica, Liquidambar formosana, Quercus acutissima, Prunus salicina, and Nephelium mutabile. Many references list the name as Aristobia testudo, but this name, though published earlier, is unavailable under the ICZN, primarily in that Johann Eusebius Voet's 1778 work giving the name testudo fails to fulfill the requirement in ICZN Article 11.4 that a work must be consistently binomial; none of Voet's 1778 names, including testudo, are available.

== Description ==
This species has a black body with yellow spots, and black tufts on the basal antennomeres, similar to the related species Aristobia approximator; however, A. approximator has tufts only on the 3rd antennal segment, while A. reticulator has tufts on segments 3, 4, and sometimes 5.
