= Cerosterna fasciculata =

Scientific classification
- Domain: Eukaryota
- Kingdom: Animalia
- Phylum: Arthropoda
- Class: Insecta
- Order: Coleoptera
- Suborder: Polyphaga
- Infraorder: Cucujiformia
- Family: Cerambycidae
- Genus: Cerosterna
- Species: C. fasciculata

Binomial name
- Cerosterna fasciculata Aurivillius, 1924

Species of beetle

Cerosterna fasciculata is a species of beetle in the family Cerambycidae. It was described by Per Olof Christopher Aurivillius in 1924 and is known from Sumatra.
