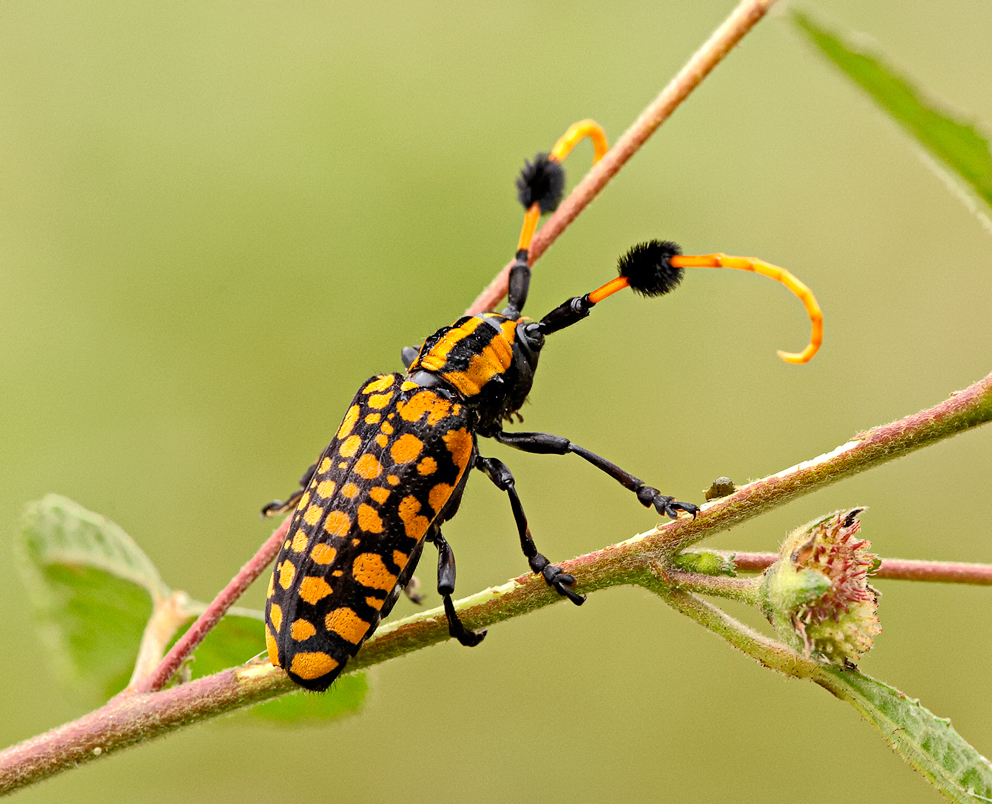
- Aristobia approximator

Scientific classification
- Domain: Eukaryota
- Kingdom: Animalia
- Phylum: Arthropoda
- Class: Insecta
- Order: Coleoptera
- Suborder: Polyphaga
- Infraorder: Cucujiformia
- Family: Cerambycidae
- Tribe: Lamiini
- Genus: Aristobia; Pascoe, 1875

= Aristobia =

Genus of beetles

Aristobia is a genus of longhorn beetles of the subfamily Lamiinae, containing the following species:

- Aristobia angustifrons Gahan, 1888
- Aristobia approximator (Thomson, 1865)
- Aristobia freneyi Schmitt, 1992
- Aristobia hispida (Saunders, 1853)
- Aristobia horridula (Hope, 1831)
- Aristobia laosensis Jiroux, Garreau, Bentanachs & Prévost, 2014
- Aristobia quadrifasciata Aurivillius, 1916
- Aristobia reticulator (Fabricius, 1781) (= testudo)
- Aristobia tavakiliani Jiroux, Garreau, Bentanachs & Prévost, 2014
- Aristobia umbrosa (Thomson, 1865)
- Aristobia vietnamensis Breuning, 1972
- Aristobia voeti Thomson, 1868
