= Cerosterna fabricii =

Scientific classification
- Domain: Eukaryota
- Kingdom: Animalia
- Phylum: Arthropoda
- Class: Insecta
- Order: Coleoptera
- Suborder: Polyphaga
- Infraorder: Cucujiformia
- Family: Cerambycidae
- Genus: Cerosterna
- Species: C. fabricii

Binomial name
- Cerosterna fabricii Thomson, 1865

Synonyms
- Celosterna fabricii Thomson, 1865

Species of beetle

Cerosterna fabricii is a species of beetle in the family Cerambycidae. It was described by James Thomson in 1865. It is known from India and Laos.

Cerosterna fabricii measure about 30 mm (1.2 in) in length.
