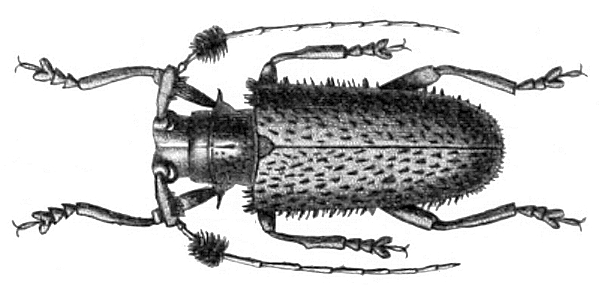

Scientific classification
- Domain: Eukaryota
- Kingdom: Animalia
- Phylum: Arthropoda
- Class: Insecta
- Order: Coleoptera
- Suborder: Polyphaga
- Infraorder: Cucujiformia
- Family: Cerambycidae
- Tribe: Lamiini
- Genus: Aristobia
- Species: A. horridula

Binomial name
- Aristobia horridula (Hope, 1831)

Synonyms
- Aristobia fasciculata (Redtenbacher, 1848); Cerosterna fasciculata Redtenbacher, 1848; Lamia horridula Hope, 1831

= Aristobia horridula =

Species of beetle

Aristobia horridula is a species of beetle in the family Cerambycidae. It was described by Frederick William Hope in 1831, originally under the genus Lamia. It is known from Myanmar, Laos, Taiwan, China, Thailand, and Vietnam.
