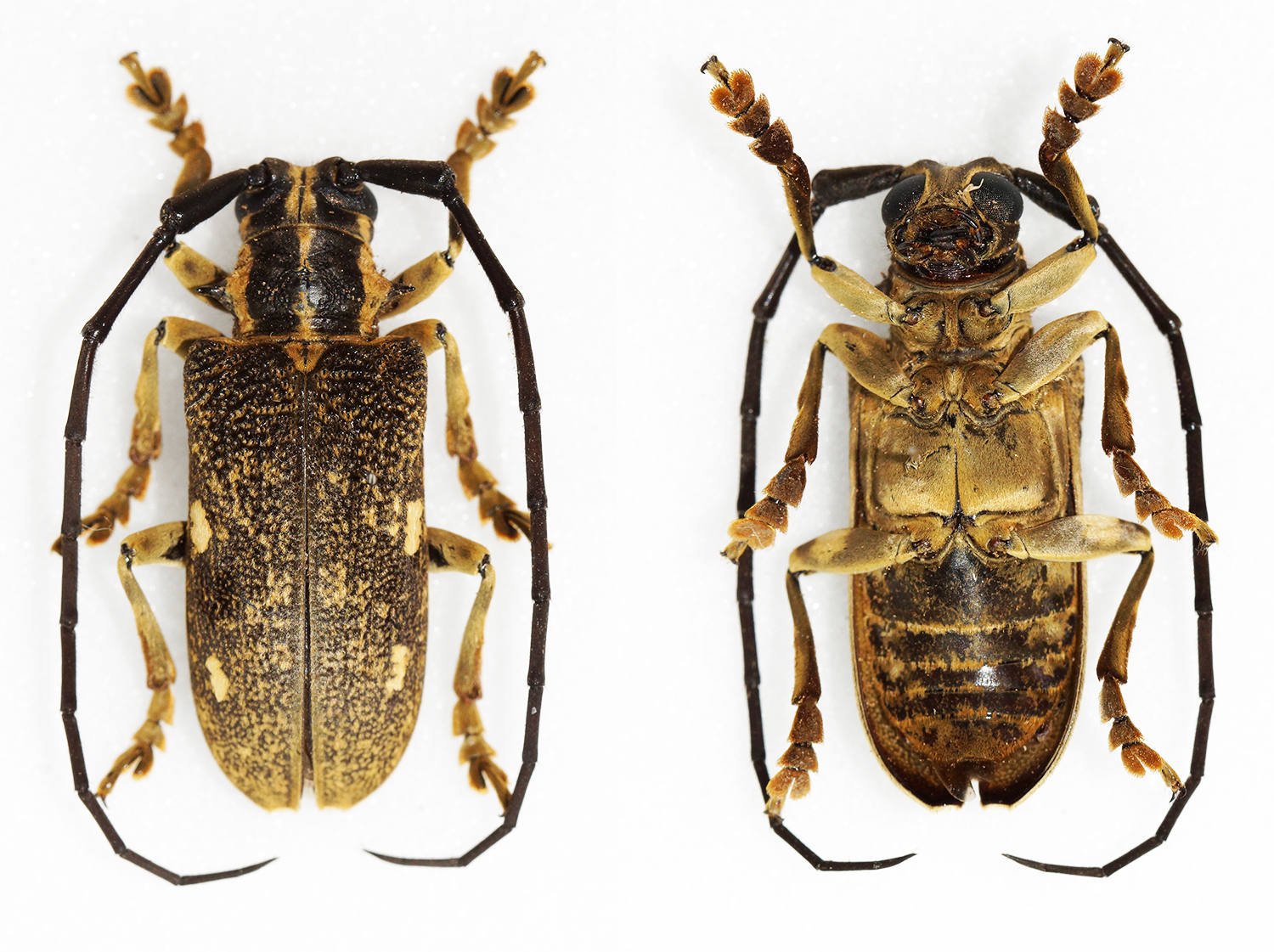
- Cerosterna variegata

Scientific classification
- Kingdom: Animalia
- Phylum: Arthropoda
- Class: Insecta
- Order: Coleoptera
- Suborder: Polyphaga
- Infraorder: Cucujiformia
- Family: Cerambycidae
- Genus: Cerosterna
- Species: C. variegata

Binomial name
- Cerosterna variegata (Aurivillius, 1911)

= Cerosterna variegata =

Species of beetle

Cerosterna variegata is a species of beetle in the family Cerambycidae. It was described by Per Olof Christopher Aurivillius in 1911 and is known from Borneo.
