= Cerosterna perakensis =

Scientific classification
- Kingdom: Animalia
- Phylum: Arthropoda
- Class: Insecta
- Order: Coleoptera
- Suborder: Polyphaga
- Infraorder: Cucujiformia
- Family: Cerambycidae
- Genus: Cerosterna
- Species: C. perakensis

Binomial name
- Cerosterna perakensis Breuning, 1976

Species of beetle

Cerosterna perakensis is a species of beetle in the family Cerambycidae. It was described by Stephan von Breuning in 1976. It is known from Peninsular Malaysia (Perak) and Borneo.

Cerosterna perakensis measure about 29 mm (1.1 in) in length.
