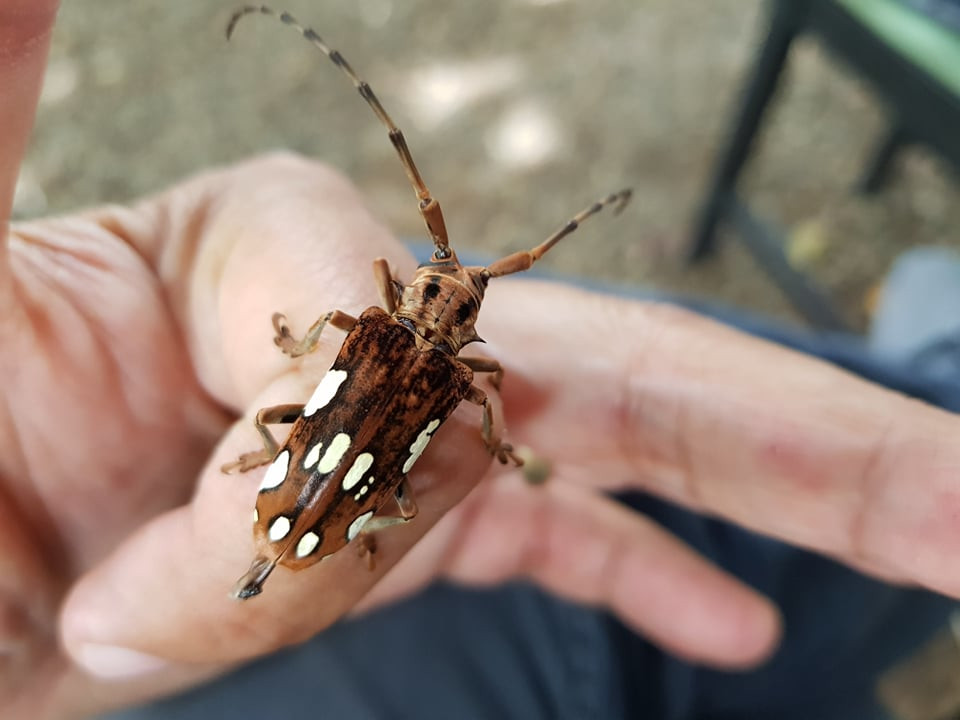
- Cerosterna pulchellator from Mindanao, Philippines

Scientific classification
- Kingdom: Animalia
- Phylum: Arthropoda
- Class: Insecta
- Order: Coleoptera
- Suborder: Polyphaga
- Infraorder: Cucujiformia
- Family: Cerambycidae
- Genus: Cerosterna
- Species: C. pulchellator

Binomial name
- Cerosterna pulchellator (Westwood, 1837)

= Cerosterna pulchellator =

Species of beetle

Cerosterna pulchellator is a species of beetle in the family Cerambycidae. It was described by Westwood in 1837. It is known from Thailand and the Philippines.

== Subspecies ==
- Cerosterna pulchellator pulchellator (Westwood, 1837)
- Cerosterna pulchellator argenteomaculata Aurivillius 1887
