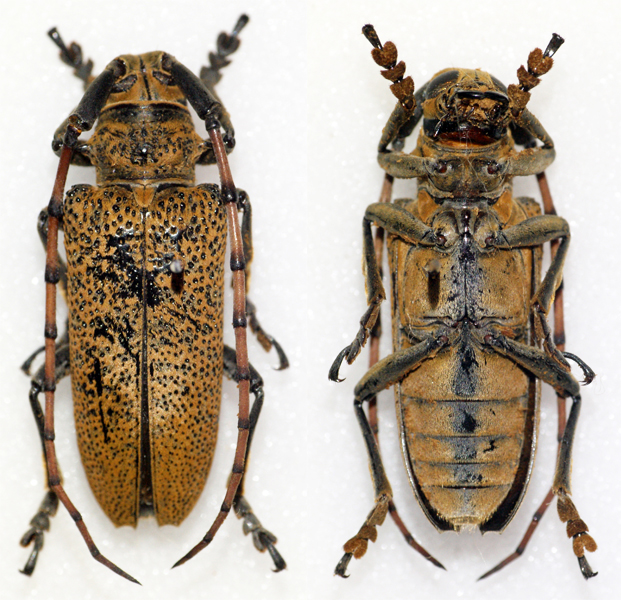

Scientific classification
- Kingdom: Animalia
- Phylum: Arthropoda
- Clade: Pancrustacea
- Class: Insecta
- Order: Coleoptera
- Suborder: Polyphaga
- Infraorder: Cucujiformia
- Family: Cerambycidae
- Genus: Cerosterna
- Species: C. scabrator

Binomial name
- Cerosterna scabrator (Fabricius, 1781)

Synonyms
- Lamia scabrator Fabricius, 1781; Lamia spinator Fabricius, 1798; Lamia gladiator Fabricius, 1801; Psaromaia Renei Pascoe, 1888; Aristobia murina Nonfried, 1894; Coelosterna scabrata Lesne, 1919 (misspelling); Celosterna scabrator var. griseator Aurivillius, 1920; Cerosterna scabratrix Löbl & Smetana, 2010 (misspelling)

= Cerosterna scabrator =

Species of beetle

Cerosterna scabrator is a species of beetle in the family Cerambycidae. It was described by Johan Christian Fabricius in 1781. It is known from Sri Lanka and India.
