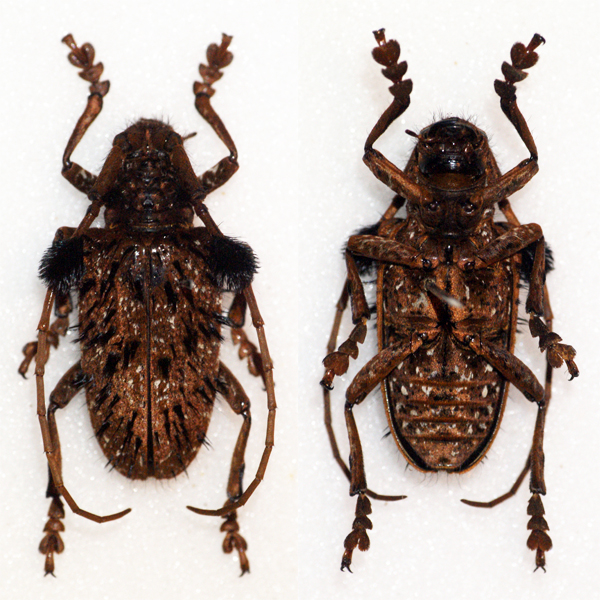

Scientific classification
- Domain: Eukaryota
- Kingdom: Animalia
- Phylum: Arthropoda
- Class: Insecta
- Order: Coleoptera
- Suborder: Polyphaga
- Infraorder: Cucujiformia
- Family: Cerambycidae
- Tribe: Lamiini
- Genus: Aristobia
- Species: A. freneyi

Binomial name
- Aristobia freneyi Schmitt, 1992

= Aristobia freneyi =

Species of beetle

Aristobia freneyi is a species of beetle in the family Cerambycidae. It was described by Schmitt in 1992. It is known from Thailand.
