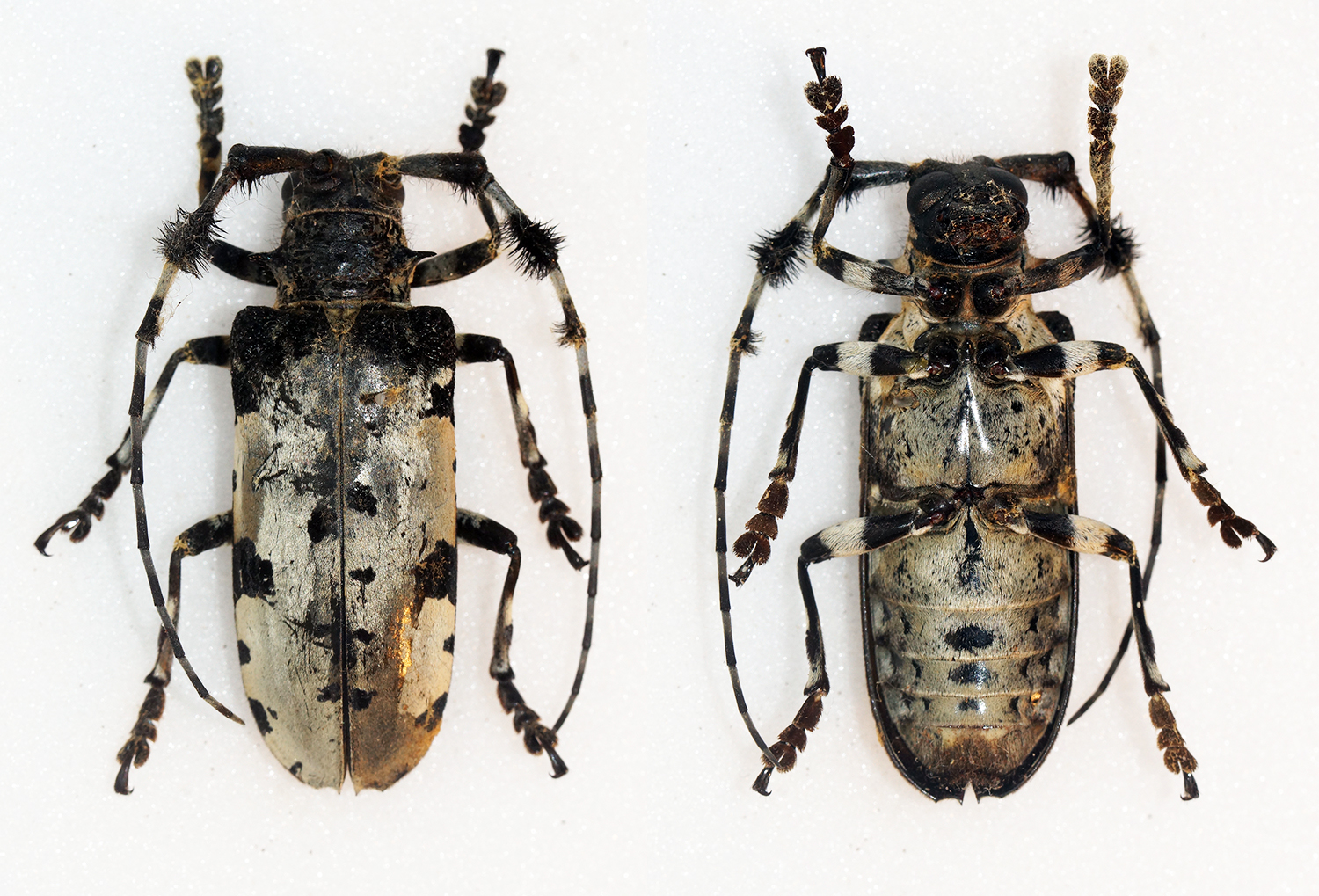

Scientific classification
- Domain: Eukaryota
- Kingdom: Animalia
- Phylum: Arthropoda
- Class: Insecta
- Order: Coleoptera
- Suborder: Polyphaga
- Infraorder: Cucujiformia
- Family: Cerambycidae
- Tribe: Lamiini
- Genus: Aristobia
- Species: A. voeti

Binomial name
- Aristobia voeti Thomson, 1878

Synonyms
- Aristobia voetii Thomson, 1878 (misspelling); Aristobia pulcherrima Nonfried, 1892

= Aristobia voeti =

Species of beetle

Aristobia voeti is a species of beetle in the family Cerambycidae. It was described by James Thomson in 1878. Although the name was originally spelled as "voetii", this spelling was not in use between 1894 and 2014, and therefore the spelling "voeti" must be preserved under ICZN Article 33.3.1, as this is the spelling that is in prevailing usage. It is known from Laos, China and Myanmar.
