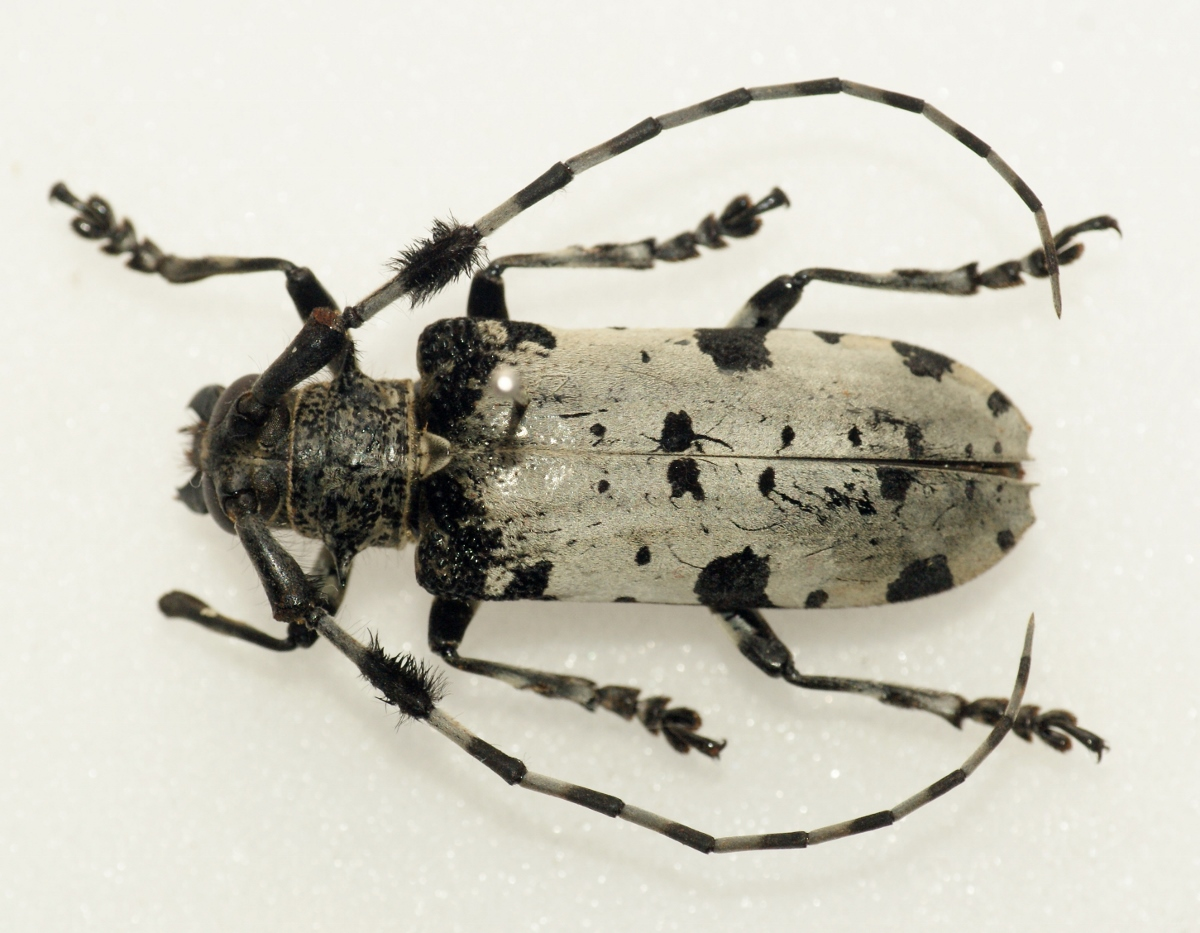
- Aristobia angustifrons

Scientific classification
- Domain: Eukaryota
- Kingdom: Animalia
- Phylum: Arthropoda
- Class: Insecta
- Order: Coleoptera
- Suborder: Polyphaga
- Infraorder: Cucujiformia
- Family: Cerambycidae
- Tribe: Lamiini
- Genus: Aristobia
- Species: A. angustifrons

Binomial name
- Aristobia angustifrons Gahan, 1888

= Aristobia angustifrons =

Species of beetle

Aristobia angustifrons is a species of beetle in the family Cerambycidae. It was described by Charles Joseph Gahan in 1888. It is known from Thailand, China and Myanmar.
