= Cerosterna stolzi =

Scientific classification
- Kingdom: Animalia
- Phylum: Arthropoda
- Clade: Pancrustacea
- Class: Insecta
- Order: Coleoptera
- Suborder: Polyphaga
- Infraorder: Cucujiformia
- Family: Cerambycidae
- Genus: Cerosterna
- Species: C. stolzi

Binomial name
- Cerosterna stolzi Ritsema, 1911

Synonyms
- Celosterna stolzi Ritsema, 1911; Loxotropoides brunnea Fisher, 1935

Species of beetle

Cerosterna stolzi is a species of beetle in the family Cerambycidae. It was described by Coenraad Ritsema in 1911. It is known from Borneo (Malaysia: Sabah), Java, and Sumatra (Indonesia).

Cerosterna stolzi measure about 26–33 mm (1.0–1.3 in) in length.
