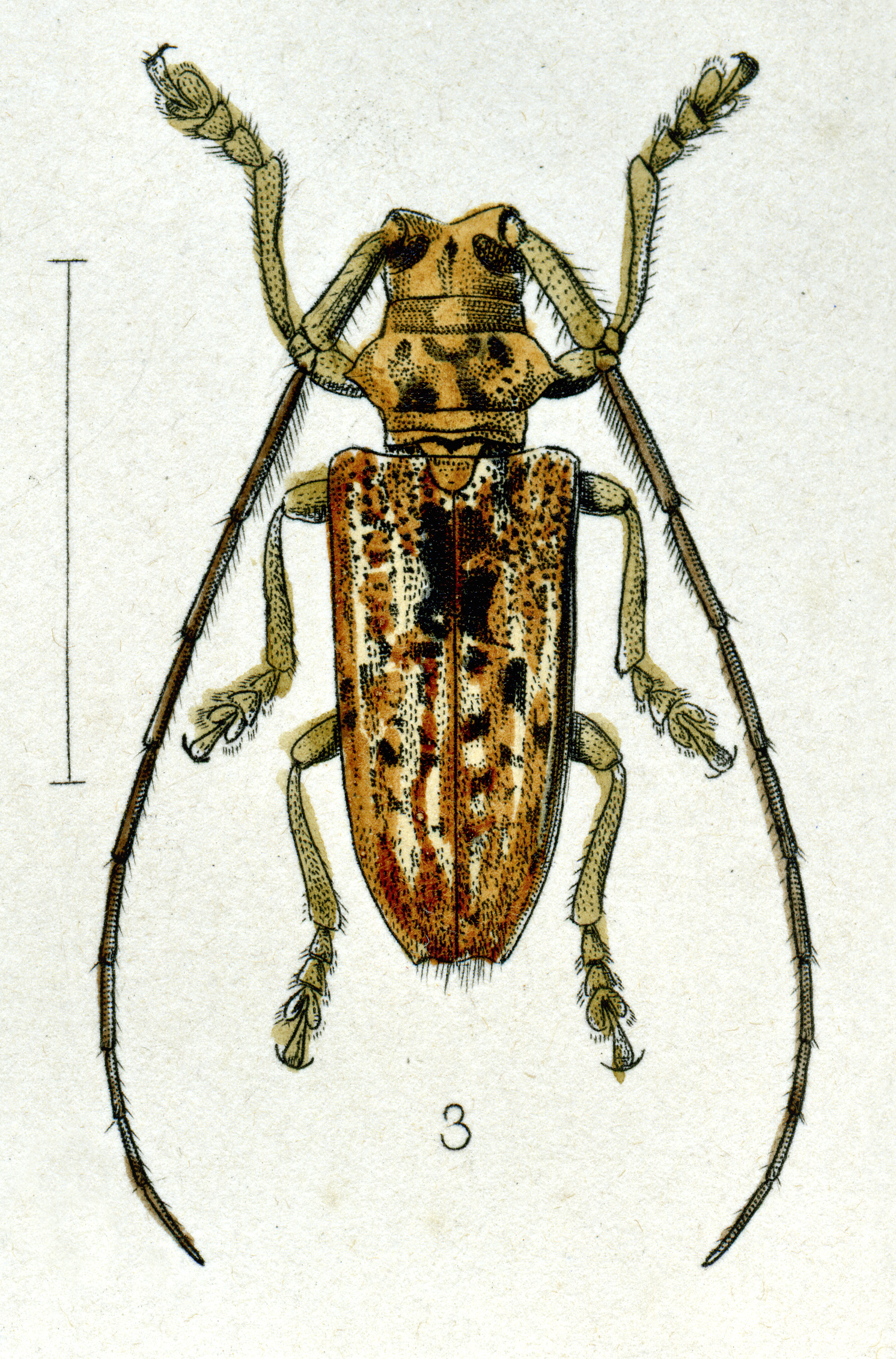

Scientific classification
- Kingdom: Animalia
- Phylum: Arthropoda
- Clade: Pancrustacea
- Class: Insecta
- Order: Coleoptera
- Suborder: Polyphaga
- Infraorder: Cucujiformia
- Family: Cerambycidae
- Genus: Cerosterna
- Species: C. javana

Binomial name
- Cerosterna javana White, 1858

= Cerosterna javana =

Species of beetle

Cerosterna javana is a species of beetle in the family Cerambycidae. It was described by White in 1858. It is known from Java and Sumatra.

== Subspecies ==
- Cerosterna javana combusta Thomson 1865
- Cerosterna javana tigrina Pascoe 1866
- Cerosterna javana javana White 1858
