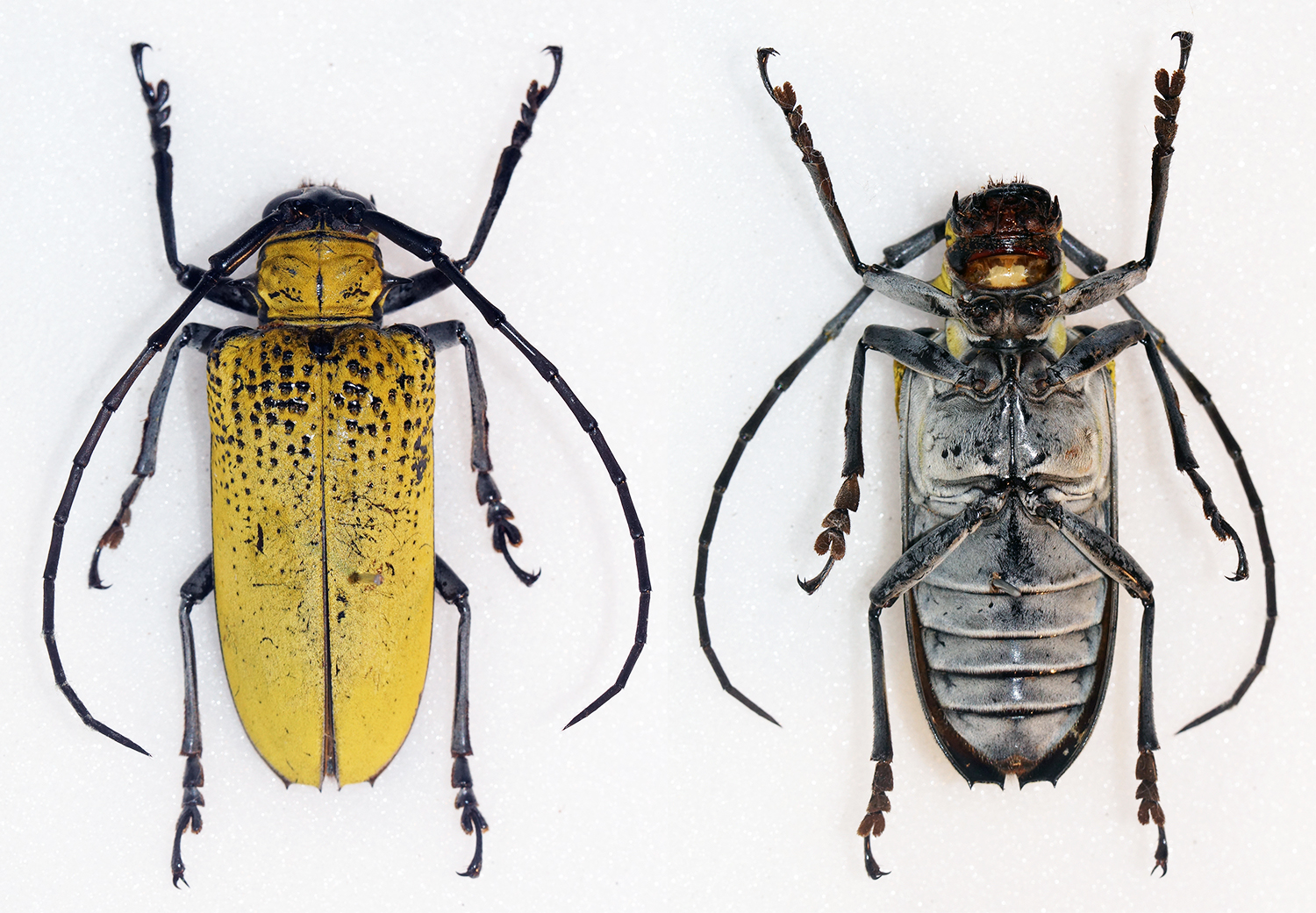
- A male Cerosterna luteopubens

Scientific classification
- Domain: Eukaryota
- Kingdom: Animalia
- Phylum: Arthropoda
- Class: Insecta
- Order: Coleoptera
- Suborder: Polyphaga
- Infraorder: Cucujiformia
- Family: Cerambycidae
- Genus: Cerosterna
- Species: C. luteopubens

Binomial name
- Cerosterna luteopubens (Pic, 1925)

= Cerosterna luteopubens =

Species of beetle

Cerosterna luteopubens is a species of beetle in the family Cerambycidae. It was described by Maurice Pic in 1925. It is known from Vietnam, Laos, Thailand, Myanmar, and Northeast India (Assam).

Cerosterna luteopubens measure about 38 mm (1.5 in) in length.
