= Aristobia laosensis =

Scientific classification
- Domain: Eukaryota
- Kingdom: Animalia
- Phylum: Arthropoda
- Class: Insecta
- Order: Coleoptera
- Suborder: Polyphaga
- Infraorder: Cucujiformia
- Family: Cerambycidae
- Tribe: Lamiini
- Genus: Aristobia
- Species: A. laosensis

Binomial name
- Aristobia laosensis Jiroux, Garreau, Bentanachs & Prévost, 2014

Species of beetle

Aristobia laosensis is a species of beetle in the family Cerambycidae. It was described by Eric Jiroux, Philippe Garreau, Joan Bentanachs and Patrick Prévost in 2014. It is known from Laos.
