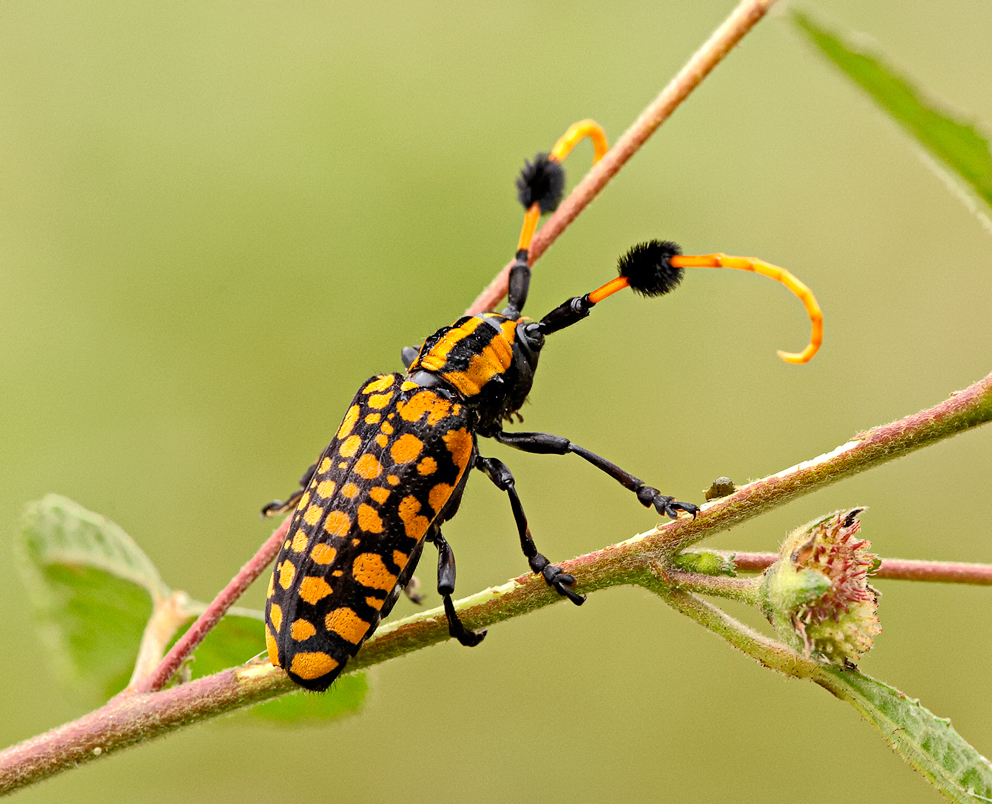

Scientific classification
- Domain: Eukaryota
- Kingdom: Animalia
- Phylum: Arthropoda
- Class: Insecta
- Order: Coleoptera
- Suborder: Polyphaga
- Infraorder: Cucujiformia
- Family: Cerambycidae
- Tribe: Lamiini
- Genus: Aristobia
- Species: A. approximator

Binomial name
- Aristobia approximator (Thomson, 1865)

= Aristobia approximator =

Species of beetle

Aristobia approximator is a species of medium-large, brightly coloured longhorn beetle (family Cerambycidae) found in Mainland Southeast Asia, northeastern India and southeastern China.

== Description ==
Adult Aristobia approximator typically are 19.5–36 mm (0.77–1.42 in) long. It has a black body with yellow-orange spots, and black tufts on the basal antennomeres, similar to the related species Aristobia reticulator; however, A. approximator has tufts only on the 3rd antennal segment, while A. reticulator has tufts on segments 3, 4, and sometimes 5.

== Diet ==
Although further research is necessary, Aristobia approximator appears to feed on a very wide range of plants and it has been reported as feeding on Aglaia, Annona, cassias (Cassia), Casuarina, Eucalyptus, crape myrtle (Lagerstroemia), Peltophorum, pears (Pyrus), roses (Rosa), teak (Tectona), Xylia and others.
