= Cerosterna rouyeri =

Scientific classification
- Kingdom: Animalia
- Phylum: Arthropoda
- Clade: Pancrustacea
- Class: Insecta
- Order: Coleoptera
- Suborder: Polyphaga
- Infraorder: Cucujiformia
- Family: Cerambycidae
- Genus: Cerosterna
- Species: C. rouyeri

Binomial name
- Cerosterna rouyeri Ritsema, 1906

Species of beetle

Cerosterna rouyeri is a species of beetle in the family Cerambycidae. It was described by Coenraad Ritsema in 1906. It is known from Indonesia (Sumatra and Java) and Laos.

Cerosterna rouyeri measure about 29–38 mm (1.1–1.5 in) in length.
