= Cerosterna pollinosa =

Scientific classification
- Kingdom: Animalia
- Phylum: Arthropoda
- Clade: Pancrustacea
- Class: Insecta
- Order: Coleoptera
- Suborder: Polyphaga
- Infraorder: Cucujiformia
- Family: Cerambycidae
- Genus: Cerosterna
- Species: C. pollinosa

Binomial name
- Cerosterna pollinosa Buquet, 1859

Species of beetle

Cerosterna pollinosa is a species of beetle in the family Cerambycidae. It was described by Jean Baptiste Lucien Buquet in 1859. It is known from Sumatra, Java, Borneo, and Thailand.

Cerosterna pollinosa measure about 41–51 mm (1.6–2.0 in) in length.
