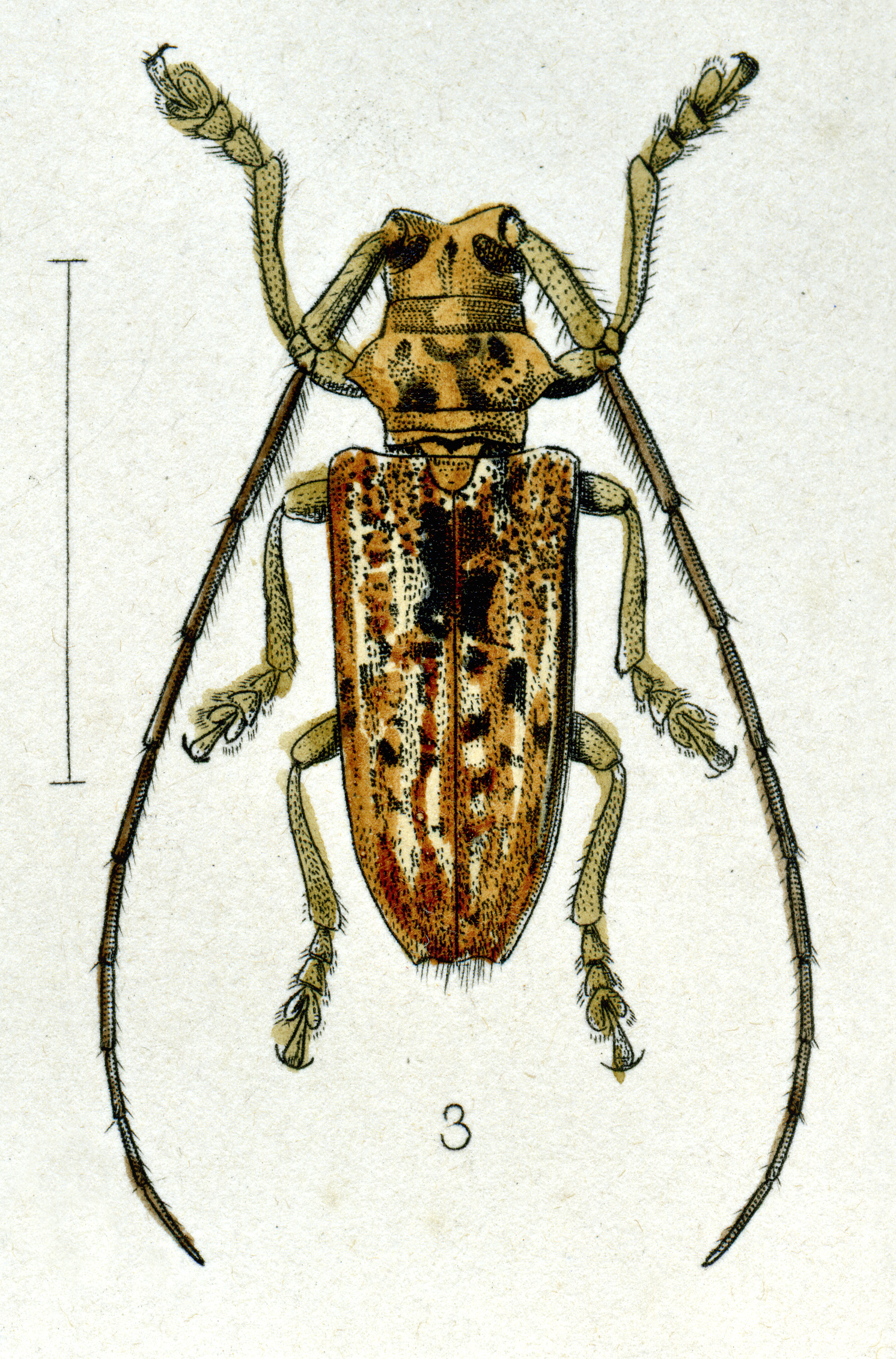
- Cerosterna javana White, 1858

Scientific classification
- Kingdom: Animalia
- Phylum: Arthropoda
- Class: Insecta
- Order: Coleoptera
- Suborder: Polyphaga
- Infraorder: Cucujiformia
- Family: Cerambycidae
- Tribe: Monochamini
- Genus: Cerosterna; Blanchard, 1845

Synonyms
- Celosterna Blanchard, 1845; Psaromaia Pascoe, 1866; Toxosterna J. Thomson, 1868; Coelosterna Gemminger, 1872; Falsopriona Pic, 1925; Loxotropoides Fisher, 1935

= Cerosterna =

Genus of beetles

Cerosterna is a genus of flat-faced longhorns beetle belonging to the family Cerambycidae, subfamily Lamiinae. The members are found in the Indomalayan realm. The name is commonly misspelled as Celosterna, an unjustified emendation of the original spelling, not valid under the ICZN.

== List of species ==
- Cerosterna fabricii Thomson, 1865
- Cerosterna fasciculata Aurivillius, 1924
- Cerosterna javana White, 1858
- Cerosterna luteopubens (Pic, 1925)
- Cerosterna perakensis Breuning, 1976
- Cerosterna pollinosa Buquet, 1859
- Cerosterna pulchellator (Westwood, 1837)
- Cerosterna ritsemai Heller, 1907
- Cerosterna rouyeri Ritsema, 1906
- Cerosterna scabrator (Fabricius, 1781)
- Cerosterna stolzi Ritsema, 1911
- Cerosterna variegata (Aurivillius, 1911)
