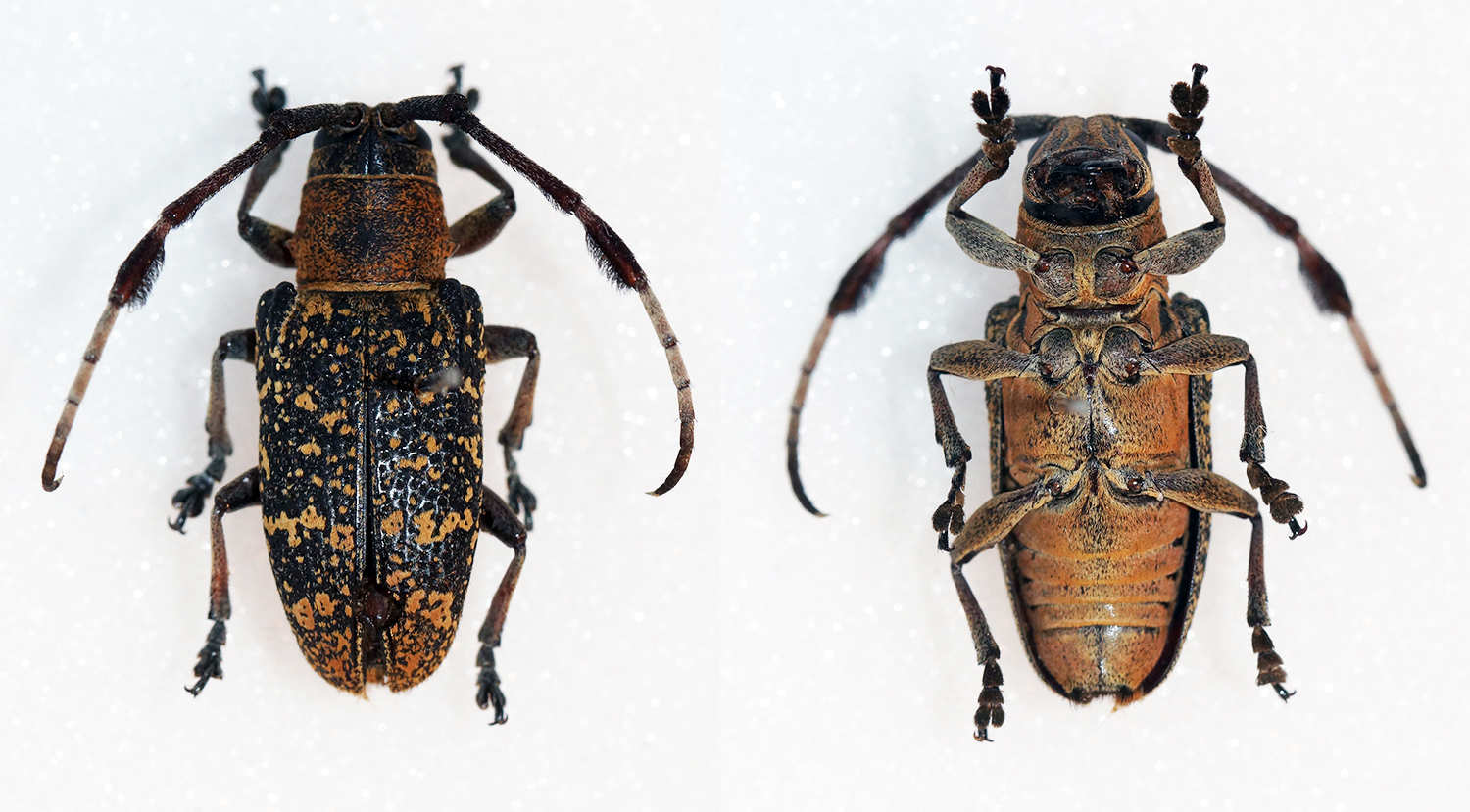

Scientific classification
- Domain: Eukaryota
- Kingdom: Animalia
- Phylum: Arthropoda
- Class: Insecta
- Order: Coleoptera
- Suborder: Polyphaga
- Infraorder: Cucujiformia
- Family: Cerambycidae
- Tribe: Lamiini
- Genus: Achthophora
- Species: A. ferruginea

Binomial name
- Achthophora ferruginea Heller, 1924

= Achthophora ferruginea =

Species of beetle

Achthophora ferruginea is a species of beetle in the family Cerambycidae found in Asia. It is endemic to the Islands of the Philippines.
