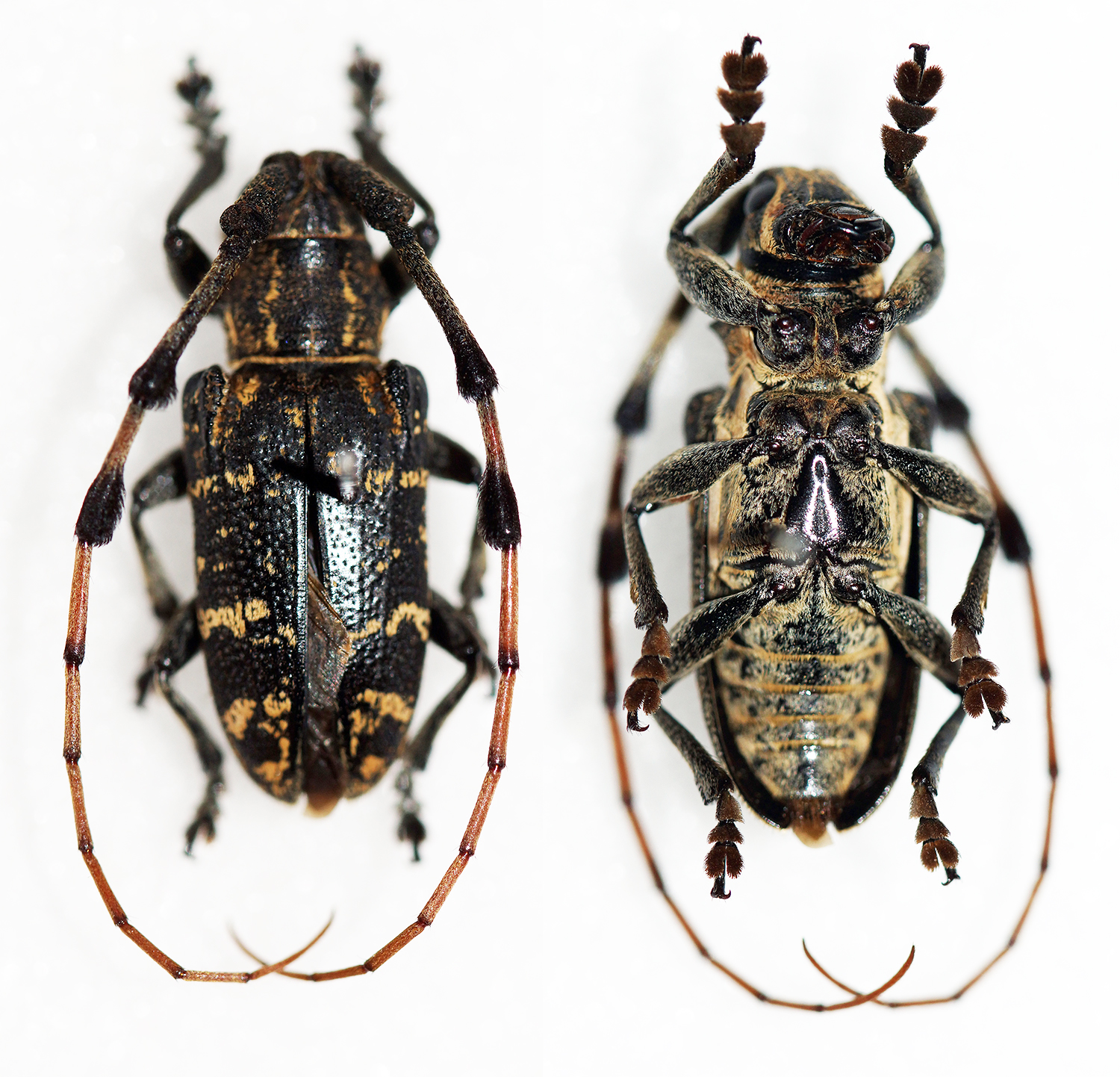
- Achthophora humeralis

Scientific classification
- Domain: Eukaryota
- Kingdom: Animalia
- Phylum: Arthropoda
- Class: Insecta
- Order: Coleoptera
- Suborder: Polyphaga
- Infraorder: Cucujiformia
- Family: Cerambycidae
- Tribe: Lamiini
- Genus: Achthophora; Newman, 1842

= Achthophora =

Genus of beetles

Achthophora is a genus of longhorn beetles of the subfamily Lamiinae, containing the following species:

- Achthophora alma Newman, 1842
- Achthophora annulicornis Heller, 1924
- Achthophora costulata Heller, 1923
- Achthophora ferruginea Heller, 1924
- Achthophora humeralis (Heller, 1916)
- Achthophora lumawigi Breuning, 1980
- Achthophora sandakana Heller, 1924
- Achthophora trifasciata Heller, 1924
- Achthophora tristis Newman, 1842
