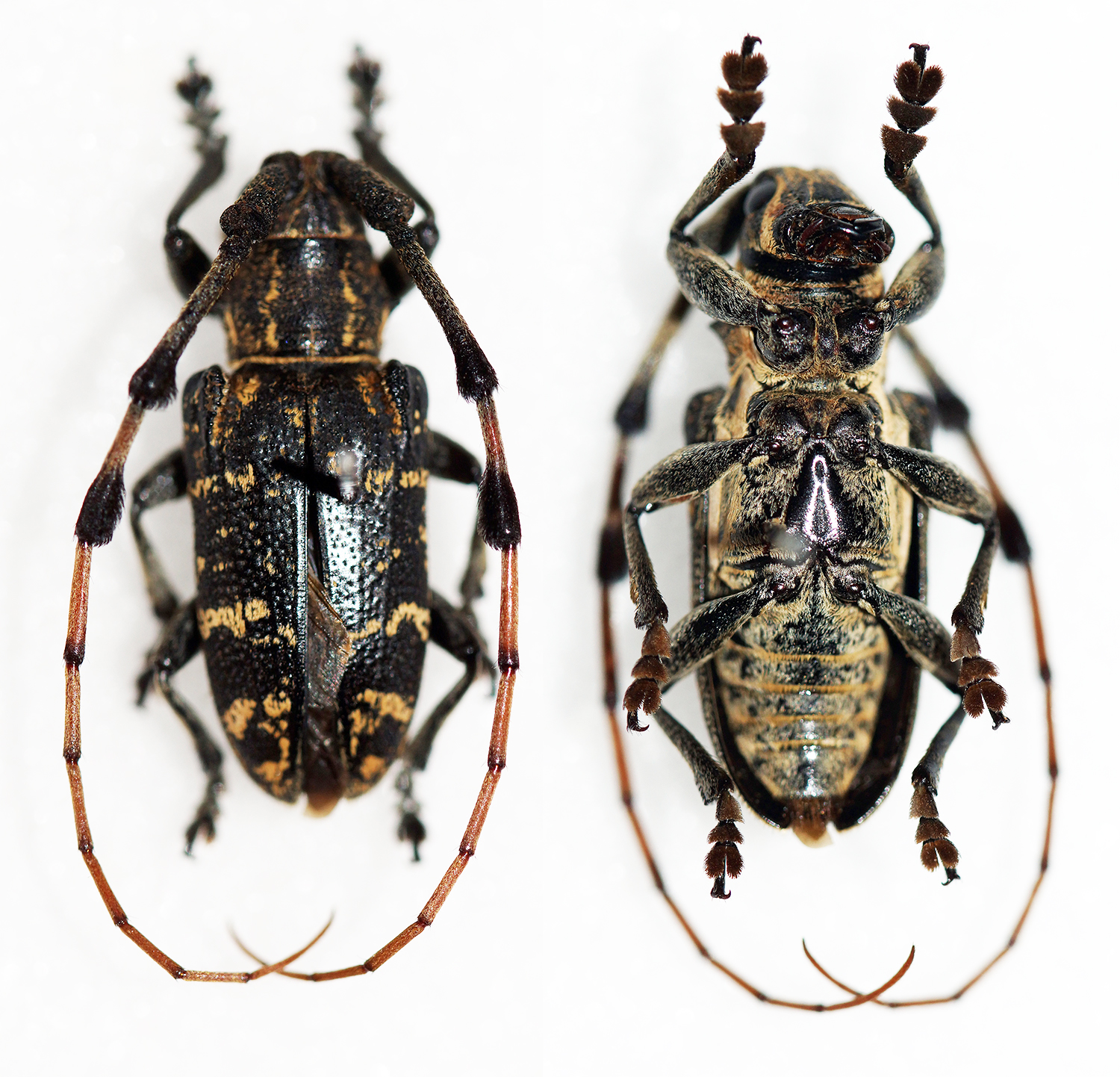
- Image of Achthophora humeralis

Scientific classification
- Kingdom: Animalia
- Phylum: Arthropoda
- Class: Insecta
- Order: Coleoptera
- Suborder: Polyphaga
- Infraorder: Cucujiformia
- Family: Cerambycidae
- Genus: Achthophora
- Species: A. tristis

Binomial name
- Achthophora tristis Newman, 1842

= Achthophora tristis =

Species of beetle

Achthophora tristis is a species of beetle in the family Cerambycidae found in Asia in countries such as the Philippines.
