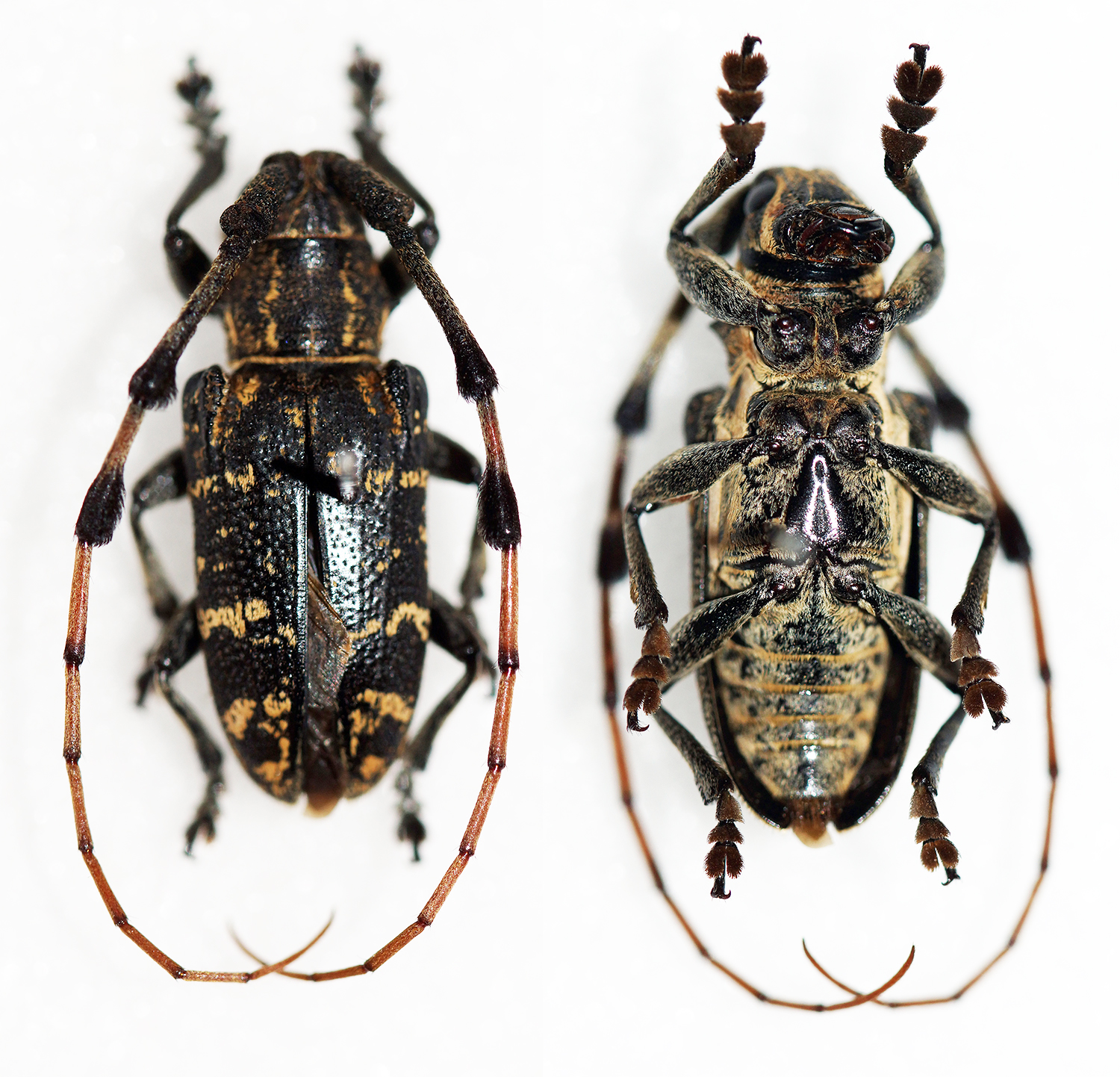

Scientific classification
- Domain: Eukaryota
- Kingdom: Animalia
- Phylum: Arthropoda
- Class: Insecta
- Order: Coleoptera
- Suborder: Polyphaga
- Infraorder: Cucujiformia
- Family: Cerambycidae
- Tribe: Lamiini
- Genus: Achthophora
- Species: A. humeralis

Binomial name
- Achthophora humeralis (Heller, 1916)

Synonyms
- Dissomatus humeralis Heller, 1916

= Achthophora humeralis =

Species of beetle

Achthophora humeralis is a species of beetle in the family Cerambycidae. It was described by Heller in 1916, originally as the type species of the genus Dissomatus. It is known from the Philippines.
