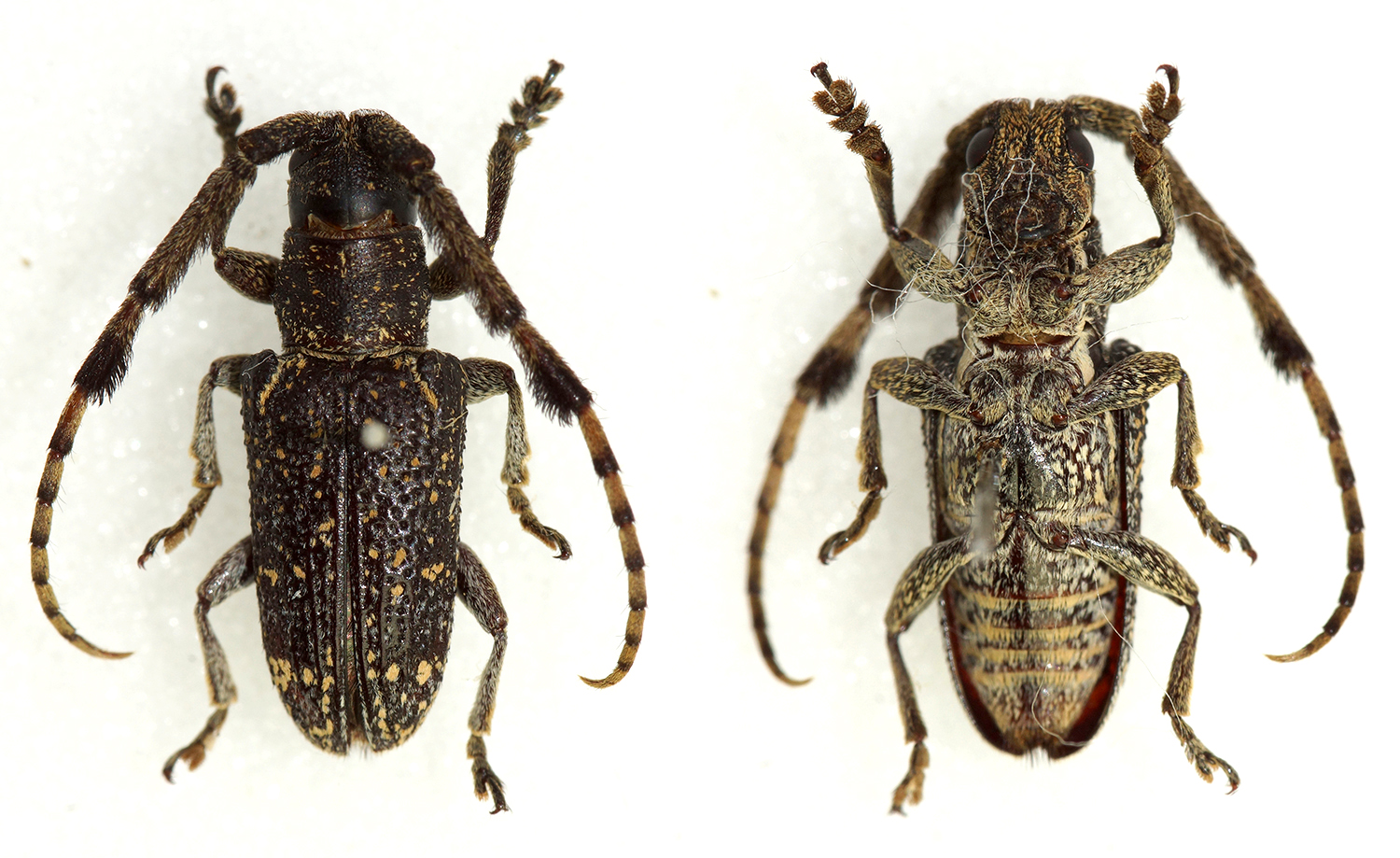

Scientific classification
- Kingdom: Animalia
- Phylum: Arthropoda
- Class: Insecta
- Order: Coleoptera
- Suborder: Polyphaga
- Infraorder: Cucujiformia
- Family: Cerambycidae
- Genus: Achthophora
- Species: A. sandakana

Binomial name
- Achthophora sandakana Heller, 1924

= Achthophora sandakana =

Species of beetle

Achthophora sandakana is a species of beetle in the family Cerambycidae. It was described by Heller in 1924. It is known from Borneo and Malaysia.
