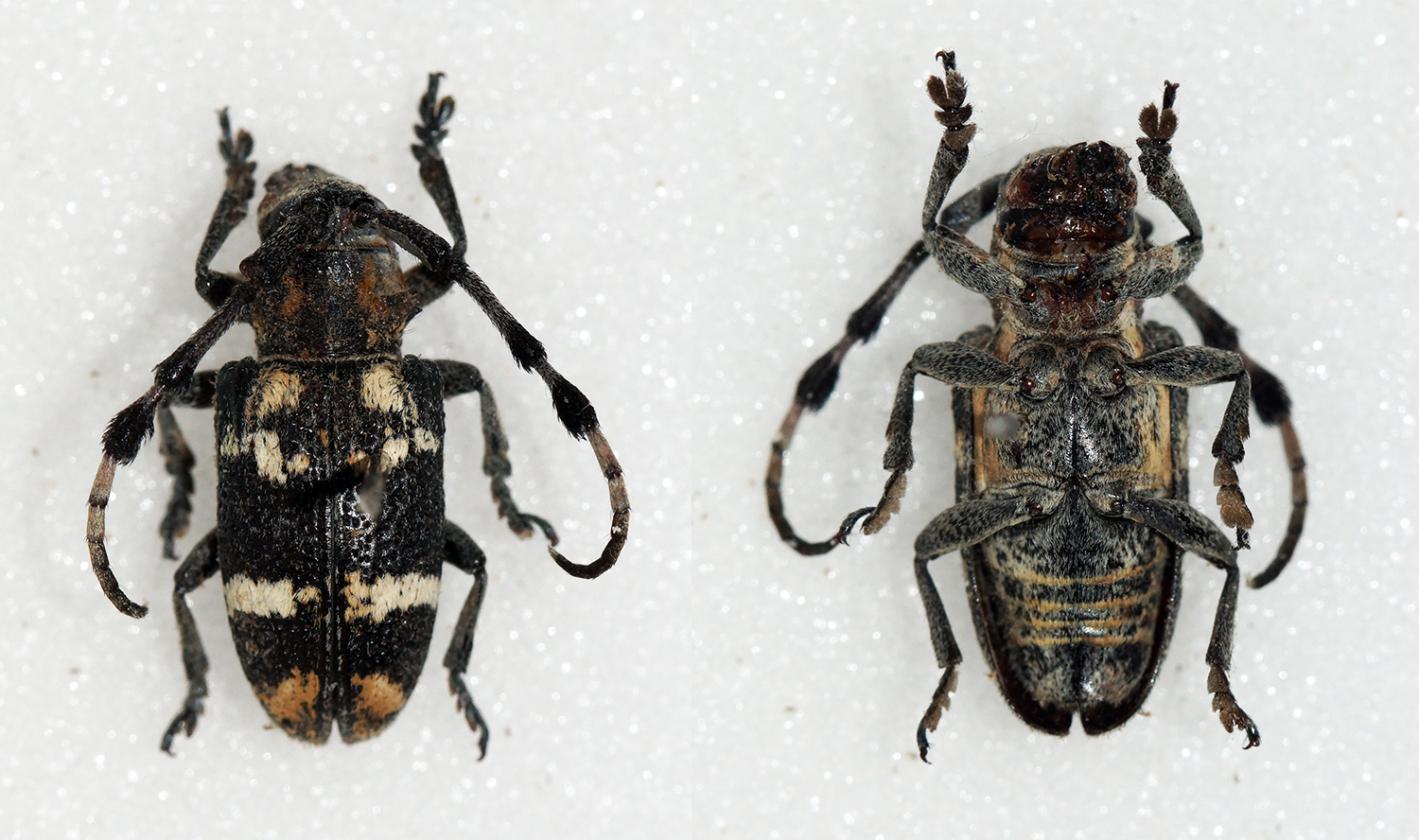

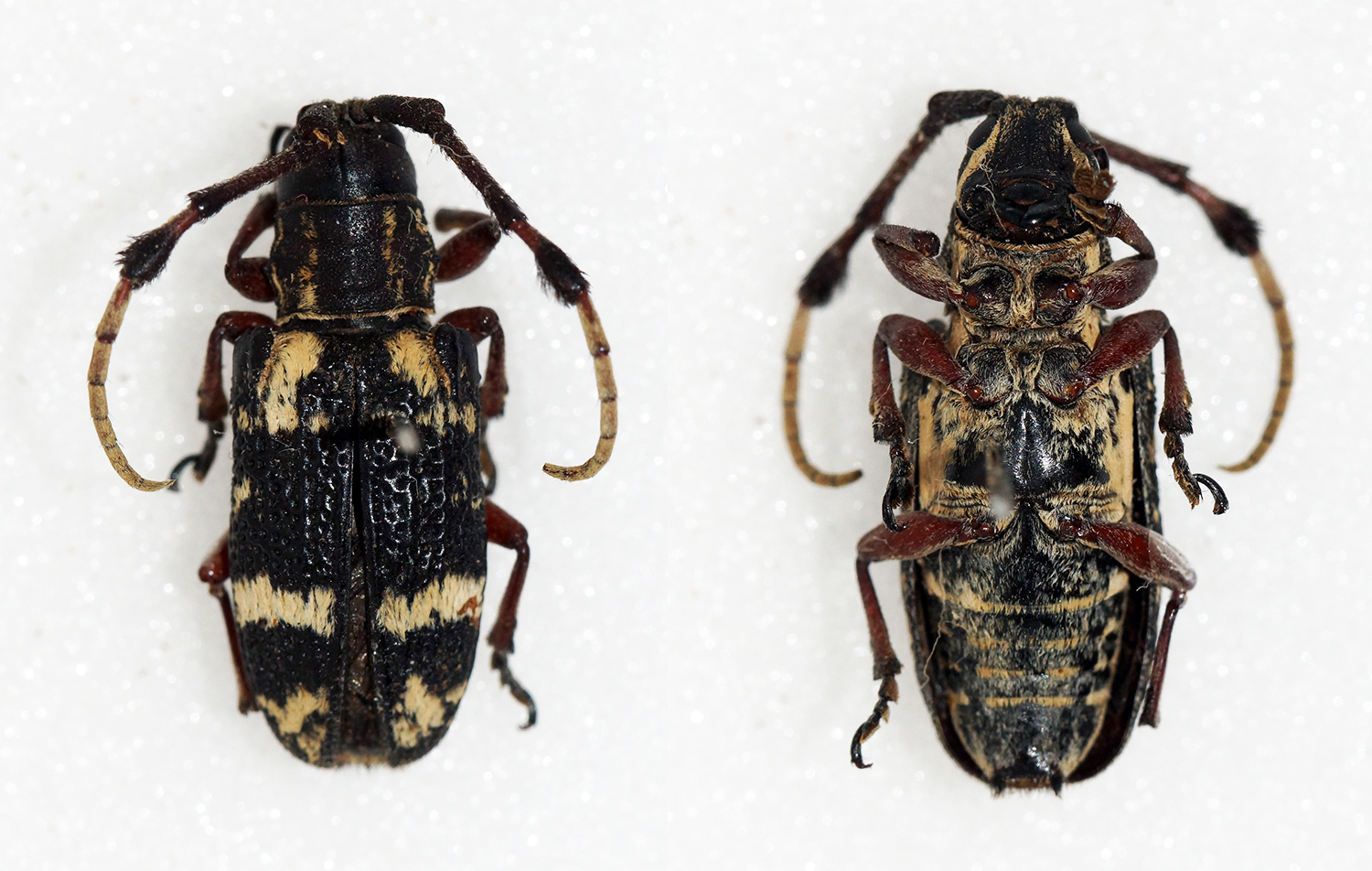

Scientific classification
- Domain: Eukaryota
- Kingdom: Animalia
- Phylum: Arthropoda
- Class: Insecta
- Order: Coleoptera
- Suborder: Polyphaga
- Infraorder: Cucujiformia
- Family: Cerambycidae
- Tribe: Lamiini
- Genus: Achthophora
- Species: A. annulicornis

Binomial name
- Achthophora annulicornis Heller, 1924

Synonyms
- Achthophora chabacana Vives, 2013 Achthophora lumawigi Breuning, 1980

= Achthophora annulicornis =

Species of beetle

Achthophora annulicornis is a species of beetle in the family Cerambycidae. It was described by Karl Heller in 1924. It is known from the Philippines.
