= Achthophora trifasciata =

Scientific classification
- Domain: Eukaryota
- Kingdom: Animalia
- Phylum: Arthropoda
- Class: Insecta
- Order: Coleoptera
- Suborder: Polyphaga
- Infraorder: Cucujiformia
- Family: Cerambycidae
- Tribe: Lamiini
- Genus: Achthophora
- Species: A. trifasciata

Binomial name
- Achthophora trifasciata Heller, 1924

Species of beetle

Achthophora trifasciata is a species of beetle in the family Cerambycidae. It was described by Heller in 1924. It is known from the Philippines.
