= Achthophora costulata =

Scientific classification
- Domain: Eukaryota
- Kingdom: Animalia
- Phylum: Arthropoda
- Class: Insecta
- Order: Coleoptera
- Suborder: Polyphaga
- Infraorder: Cucujiformia
- Family: Cerambycidae
- Tribe: Lamiini
- Genus: Achthophora
- Species: A. costulata

Binomial name
- Achthophora costulata Heller, 1923

Species of beetle

Achthophora costulata is a species of beetle in the family Cerambycidae. It was described by Heller in 1923. It is known from the Philippines.
