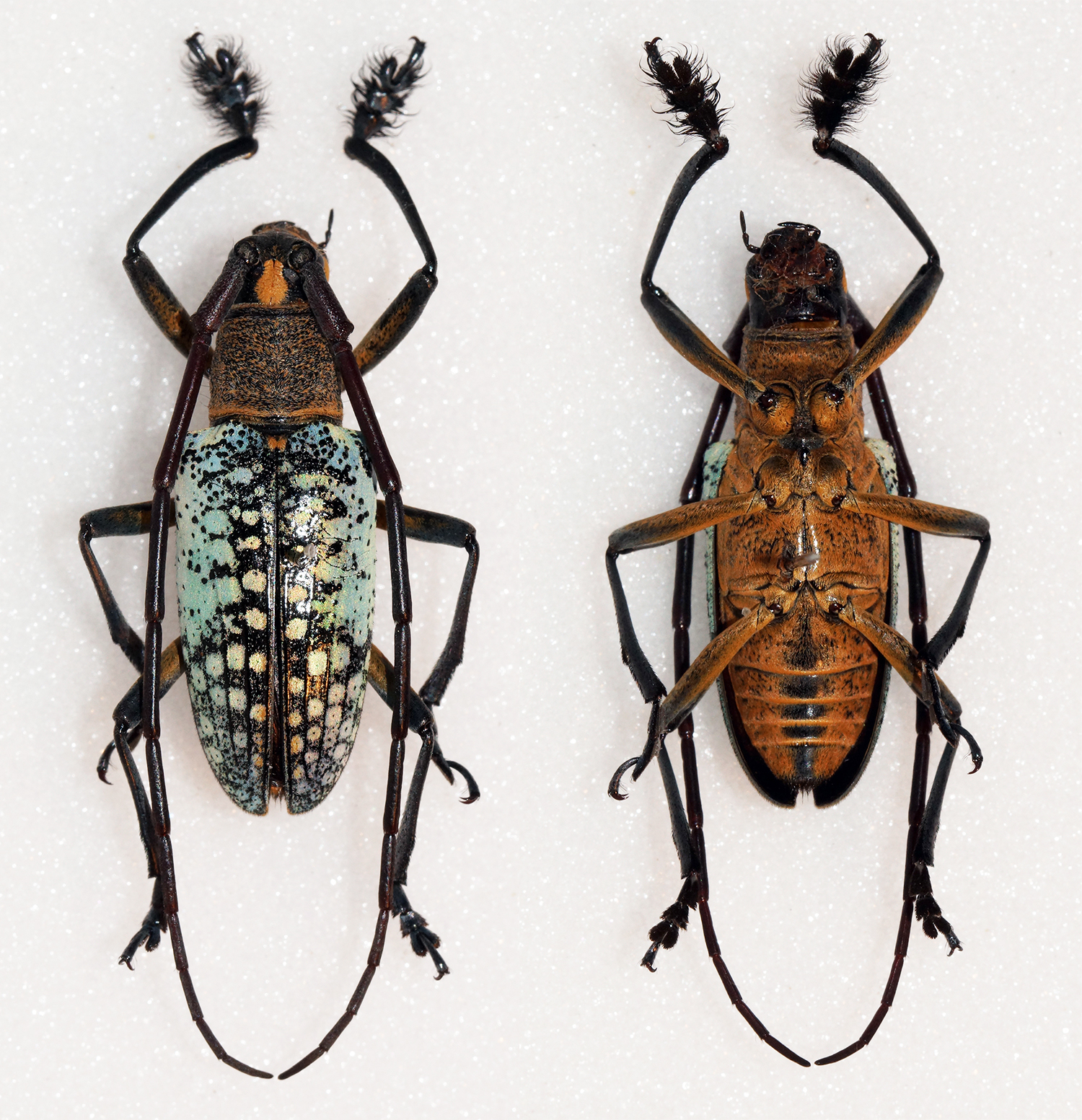

Scientific classification
- Kingdom: Animalia
- Phylum: Arthropoda
- Class: Insecta
- Order: Coleoptera
- Suborder: Polyphaga
- Infraorder: Cucujiformia
- Family: Cerambycidae
- Genus: Pericycos
- Species: P. princeps

Binomial name
- Pericycos princeps (Pascoe, 1878)

Synonyms
- Peribasis princeps Pascoe, 1878

= Pericycos princeps =

Species of beetle

Pericycos princeps is a species of beetle in the family Cerambycidae. It was described by Francis Polkinghorne Pascoe in 1878. It is known from Malaysia.

== Subspecies ==
- Pericycos princeps flavoapicalis Breuning, 1979
- Pericycos princeps princeps (Pascoe, 1878)
