= Pericycos guttatus =

Scientific classification
- Kingdom: Animalia
- Phylum: Arthropoda
- Clade: Pancrustacea
- Class: Insecta
- Order: Coleoptera
- Suborder: Polyphaga
- Infraorder: Cucujiformia
- Family: Cerambycidae
- Genus: Pericycos
- Species: P. guttatus

Binomial name
- Pericycos guttatus (Heller, 1898)

Synonyms
- Cycos guttatus Heller, 1898; Peribasis guttata (Heller, 1898)

Species of beetle

Pericycos guttatus is a species of beetle in the family Cerambycidae. It was described by Heller in 1898, originally under the genus Cycos. It is known from Sulawesi.
