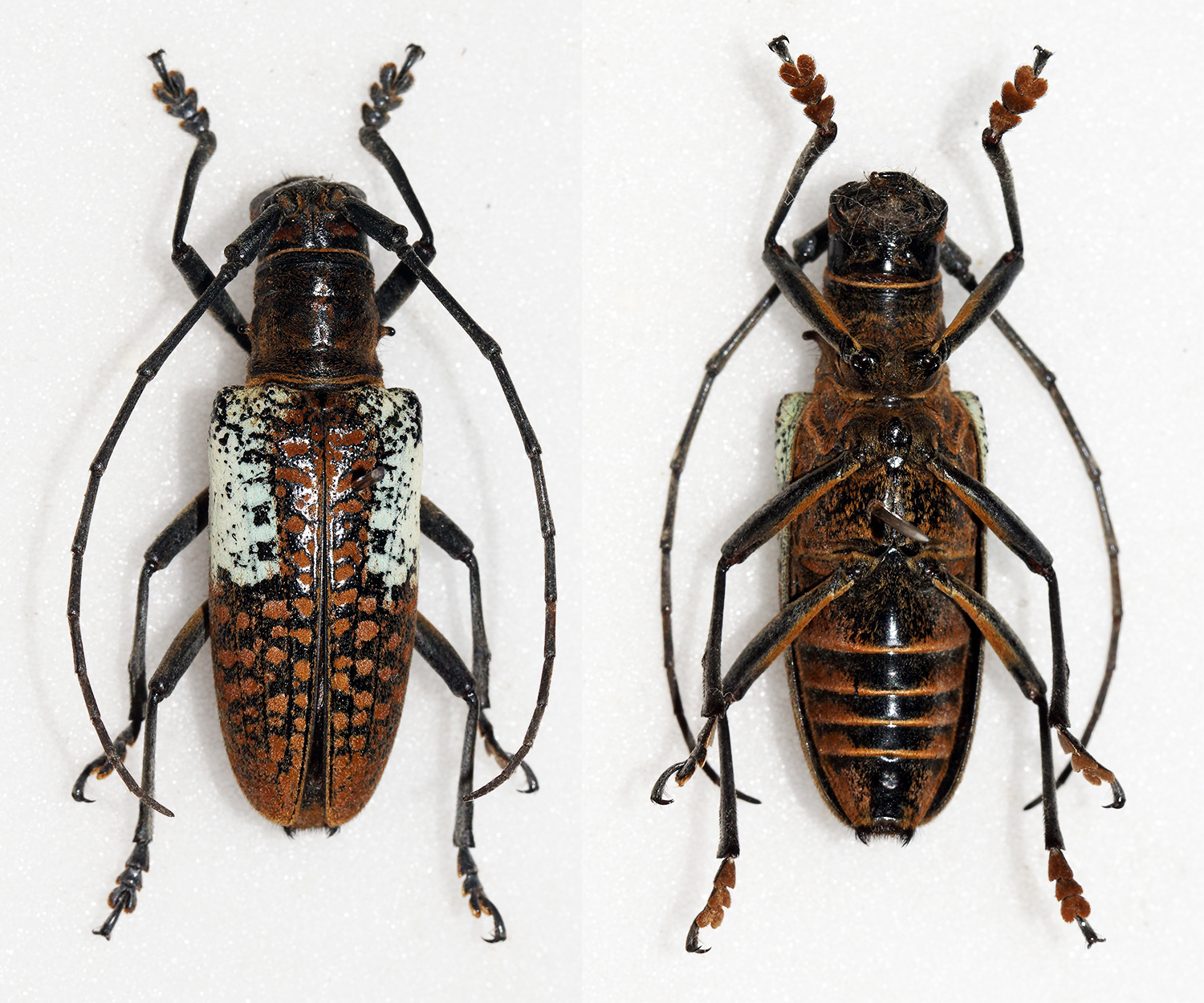

Scientific classification
- Kingdom: Animalia
- Phylum: Arthropoda
- Class: Insecta
- Order: Coleoptera
- Suborder: Polyphaga
- Infraorder: Cucujiformia
- Family: Cerambycidae
- Tribe: Lamiini
- Genus: Pericycos; Breuning, 1943

= Pericycos =

Genus of beetles

Pericycos is a genus of longhorn beetles of the subfamily Lamiinae, containing the following species:

- Pericycos fruhstorferi Breuning, 1957
- Pericycos guttatus (Heller, 1898)
- Pericycos philippinensis Breuning, 1944
- Pericycos princeps (Pascoe, 1878)
- Pericycos sulawensis Hüdepohl, 1990
- Pericycos teragramus Gilmour, 1950
- Pericycos varieguttatus (Schwarzer, 1926)
