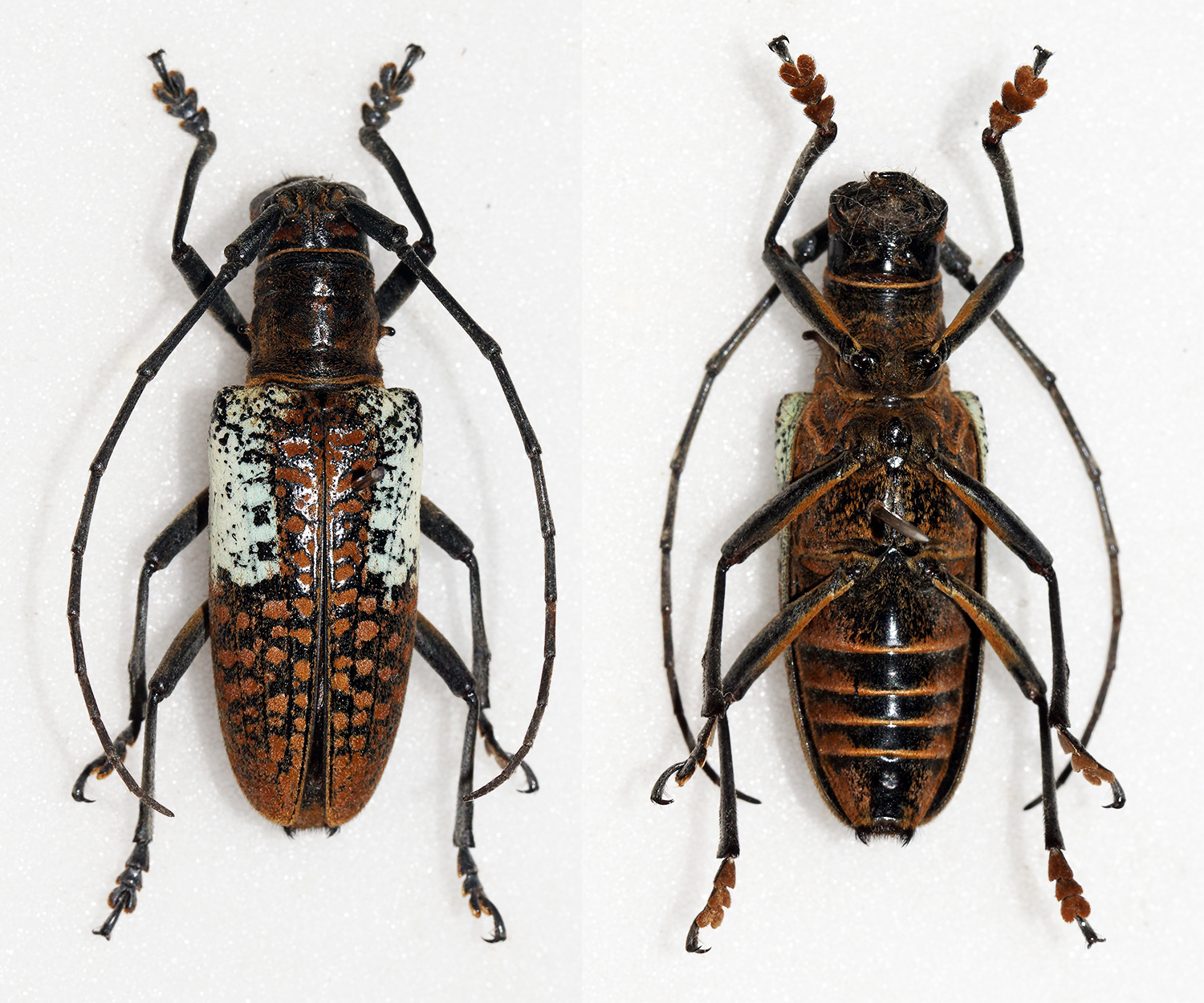

Scientific classification
- Kingdom: Animalia
- Phylum: Arthropoda
- Clade: Pancrustacea
- Class: Insecta
- Order: Coleoptera
- Suborder: Polyphaga
- Infraorder: Cucujiformia
- Family: Cerambycidae
- Genus: Pericycos
- Species: P. sulawensis

Binomial name
- Pericycos sulawensis Hüdepohl, 1990

= Pericycos sulawensis =

Species of beetle

Pericycos sulawensis is a species of beetle in the family Cerambycidae. It was described by Karl-Ernst Hüdepohl in 1990. It is known from Sulawesi.
