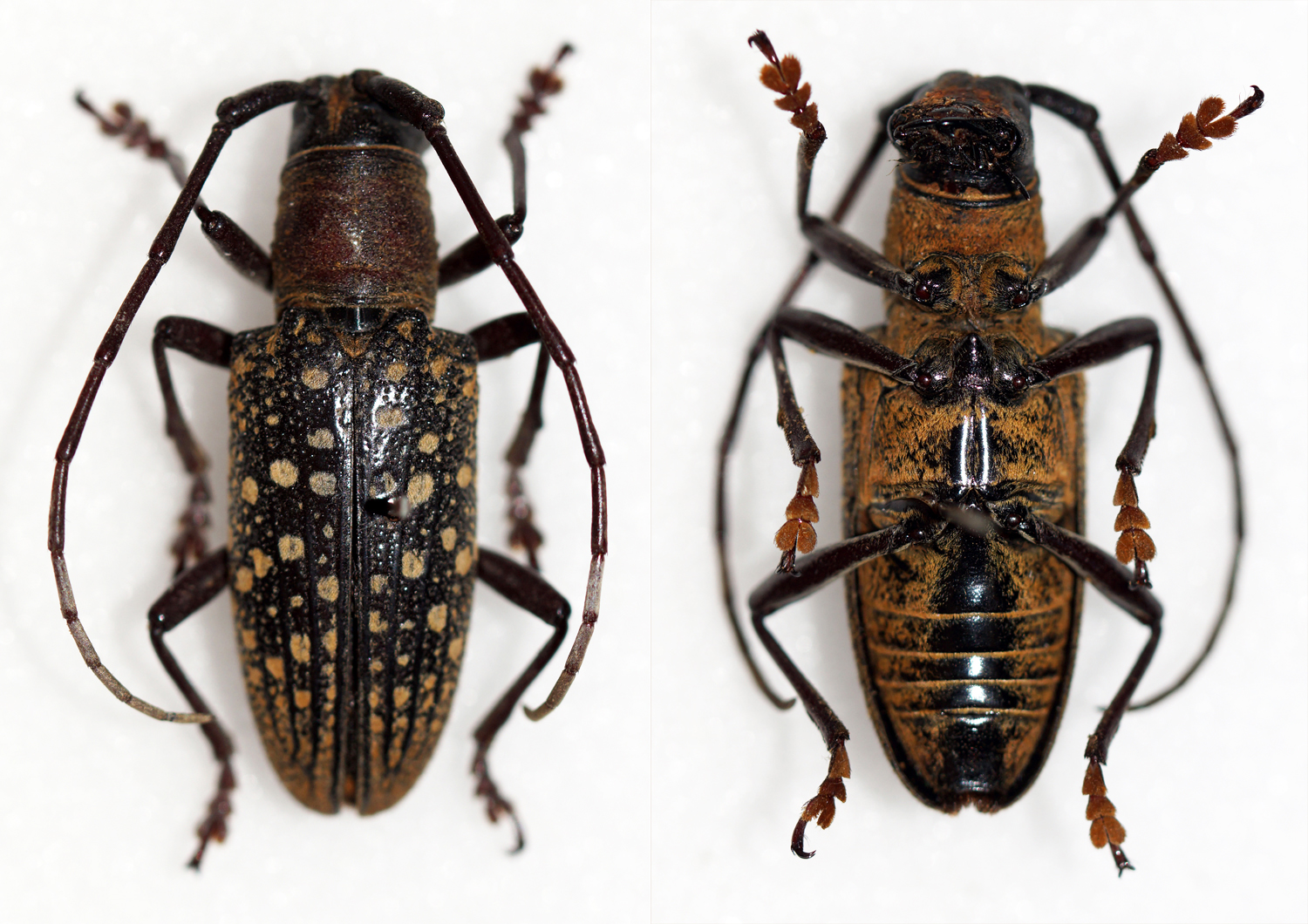
- Sex: Female

Scientific classification
- Kingdom: Animalia
- Phylum: Arthropoda
- Class: Insecta
- Order: Coleoptera
- Suborder: Polyphaga
- Infraorder: Cucujiformia
- Family: Cerambycidae
- Genus: Pericycos
- Species: P. philippinensis

Binomial name
- Pericycos philippinensis Breuning, 1944

= Pericycos philippinensis =

Species of beetle

Pericycos philippinensis is a species of beetle in the family Cerambycidae. It was described by Stephan von Breuning in 1944. It is known from the Philippines.
