= Pericycos varieguttatus =

Scientific classification
- Kingdom: Animalia
- Phylum: Arthropoda
- Class: Insecta
- Order: Coleoptera
- Suborder: Polyphaga
- Infraorder: Cucujiformia
- Family: Cerambycidae
- Genus: Pericycos
- Species: P. varieguttatus

Binomial name
- Pericycos varieguttatus (Schwarzer, 1926)

Synonyms
- Cycos varieguttatus Schwarzer, 1926

Species of beetle

Pericycos varieguttatus is a species of beetle in the family Cerambycidae. It was described by Bernhard Schwarzer in 1926. It is known from Sumatra.
