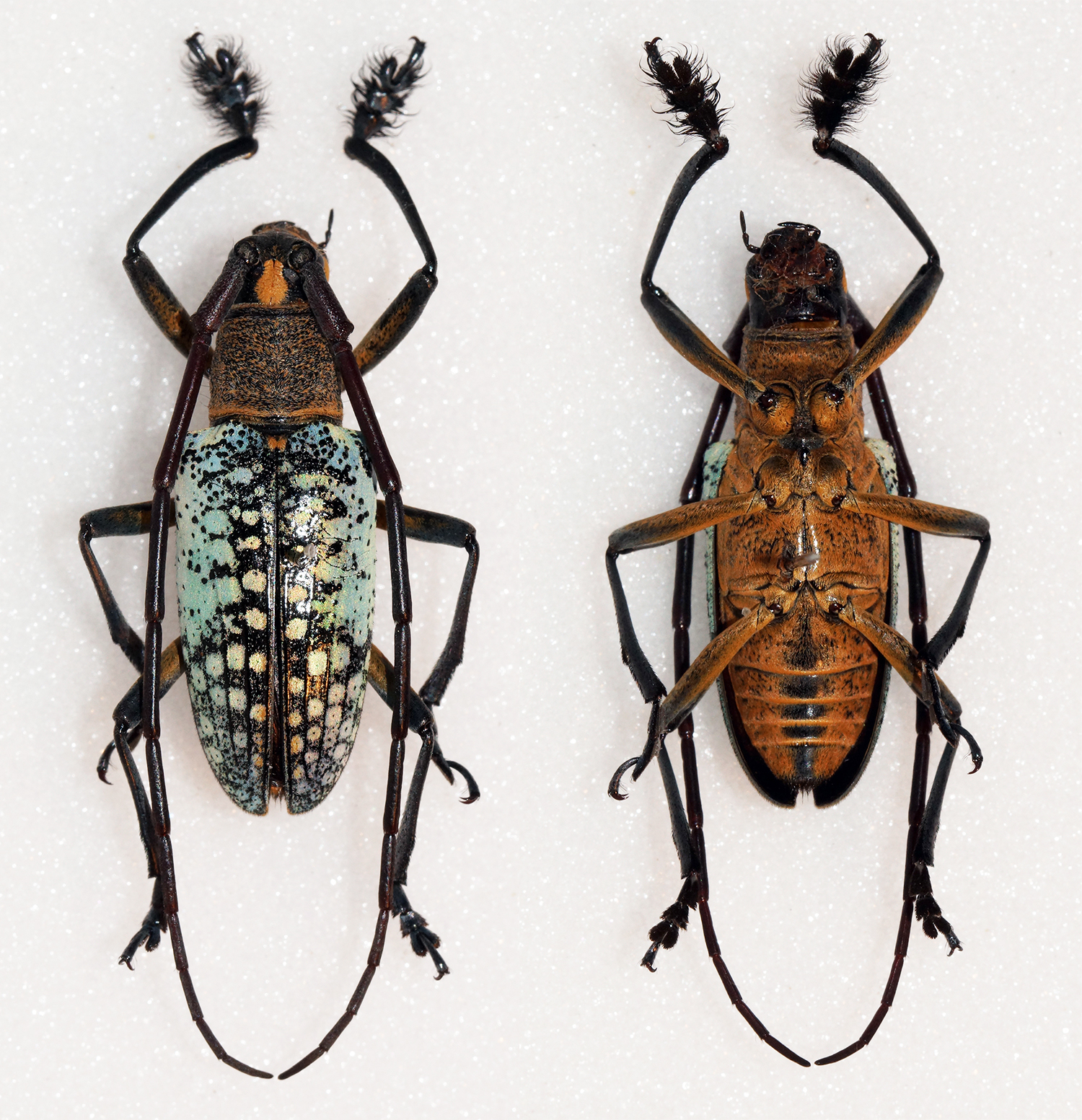
- Sex: Male

Scientific classification
- Kingdom: Animalia
- Phylum: Arthropoda
- Class: Insecta
- Order: Coleoptera
- Suborder: Polyphaga
- Infraorder: Cucujiformia
- Family: Cerambycidae
- Genus: Pericycos
- Species: P. teragramus

Binomial name
- Pericycos teragramus Gilmour, 1950

= Pericycos teragramus =

Species of beetle

Pericycos teragramus is a species of beetle in the family Cerambycidae. It was described by Gilmour in 1950. It is known from Borneo and Malaysia.
