= Chyptodes dejeani =

Scientific classification
- Kingdom: Animalia
- Phylum: Arthropoda
- Class: Insecta
- Order: Coleoptera
- Suborder: Polyphaga
- Infraorder: Cucujiformia
- Family: Cerambycidae
- Genus: Chyptodes
- Species: C. dejeani

Binomial name
- Chyptodes dejeani (Thomson, 1865)

Synonyms
- Parataeniotes dejeani (Thomson) Breuning, 1943; Ptychodes dejeanii Thomson, 1865

Species of beetle

Chyptodes dejeani is a species of beetle in the family Cerambycidae. It was described by James Thomson in 1865, originally under the genus Ptychodes. It is known from Mexico.
