= Chyptodes albosuturalis =

Scientific classification
- Kingdom: Animalia
- Phylum: Arthropoda
- Class: Insecta
- Order: Coleoptera
- Suborder: Polyphaga
- Infraorder: Cucujiformia
- Family: Cerambycidae
- Genus: Chyptodes
- Species: C. albosuturalis

Binomial name
- Chyptodes albosuturalis E. Fuchs, 1961

Species of beetle

Chyptodes albosuturalis is a species of beetle in the family Cerambycidae. It was described by Ernst Fuchs in 1961. It is known from Guatemala.
