= Ptychodes politus =

Scientific classification
- Domain: Eukaryota
- Kingdom: Animalia
- Phylum: Arthropoda
- Class: Insecta
- Order: Coleoptera
- Suborder: Polyphaga
- Infraorder: Cucujiformia
- Family: Cerambycidae
- Genus: Ptychodes
- Species: P. politus

Binomial name
- Ptychodes politus Audinet-Serville, 1835

Synonyms
- Ptychodes batesi Breuning, 1943; Ptychodes lecontei Thomson, 1856; Taeniotes lineata Newman, 1838; Ptychodes polita Audinet-Serville, 1835 (misspelling)

Species of beetle

Ptychodes politus is a species of beetle in the family Cerambycidae. It was described by Audinet-Serville in 1835. It is known from Guatemala, Costa Rica, El Salvador, Mexico, Panama, Honduras, Belize, and Nicaragua.

== Subspecies ==
- Ptychodes politus lecontei Thomson, 1856
- Ptychodes politus politus Audinet-Serville, 1835
