= Chyptodes =

Scientific classification
- Kingdom: Animalia
- Phylum: Arthropoda
- Class: Insecta
- Order: Coleoptera
- Suborder: Polyphaga
- Infraorder: Cucujiformia
- Family: Cerambycidae
- Tribe: Lamiini
- Genus: Chyptodes

Genus of beetles

Chyptodes is a genus of longhorn beetles of the subfamily Lamiinae, containing the following species:

- Chyptodes albosuturalis Fuchs, 1961
- Chyptodes dejeani (Thomson, 1865)
