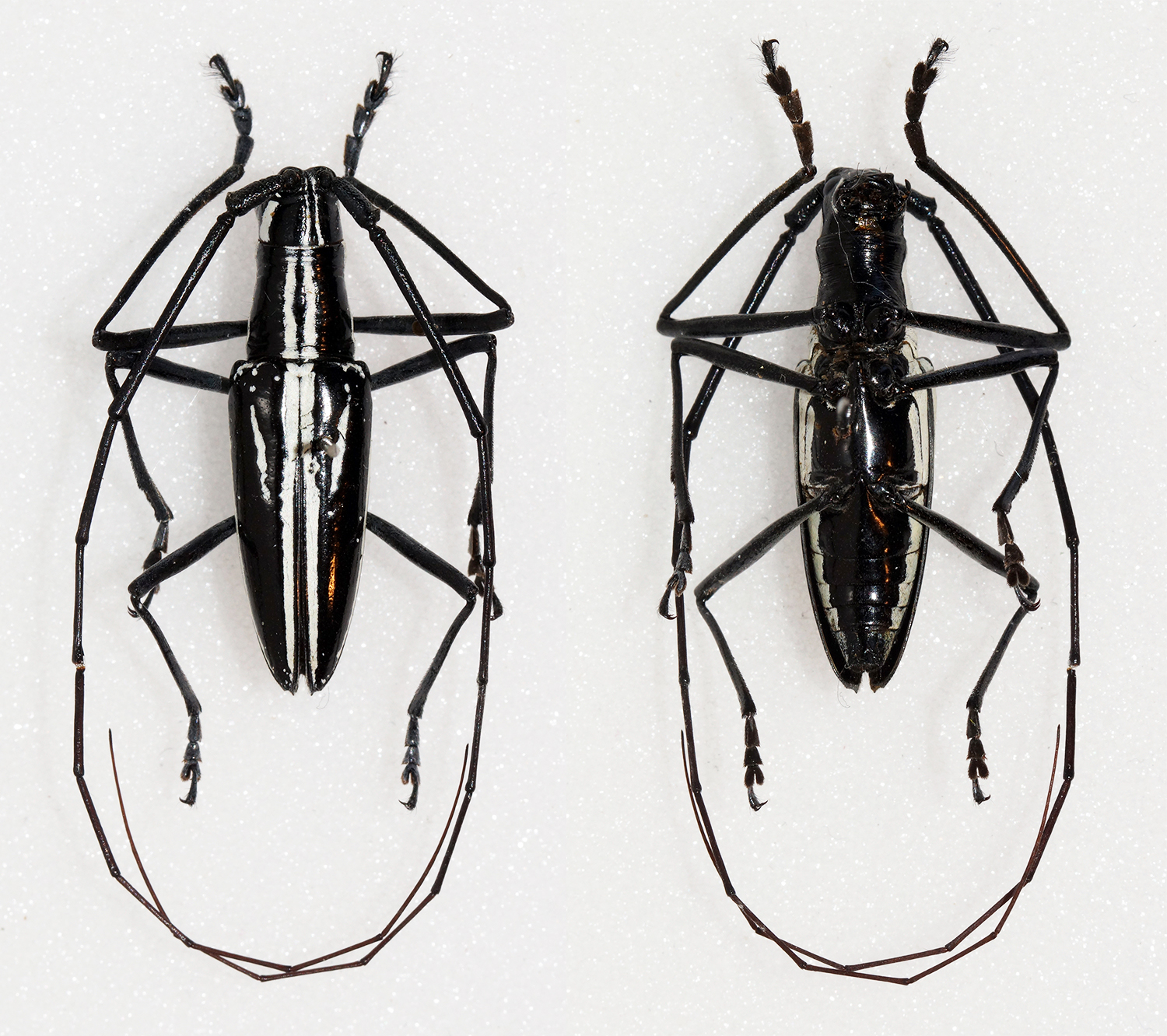

Scientific classification
- Domain: Eukaryota
- Kingdom: Animalia
- Phylum: Arthropoda
- Class: Insecta
- Order: Coleoptera
- Suborder: Polyphaga
- Infraorder: Cucujiformia
- Family: Cerambycidae
- Genus: Ptychodes
- Species: P. mixtus

Binomial name
- Ptychodes mixtus Bates, 1880

= Ptychodes mixtus =

Species of beetle

Ptychodes mixtus is a species of beetle in the family Cerambycidae. It was described by Henry Walter Bates in 1880. It is known from Panama.
