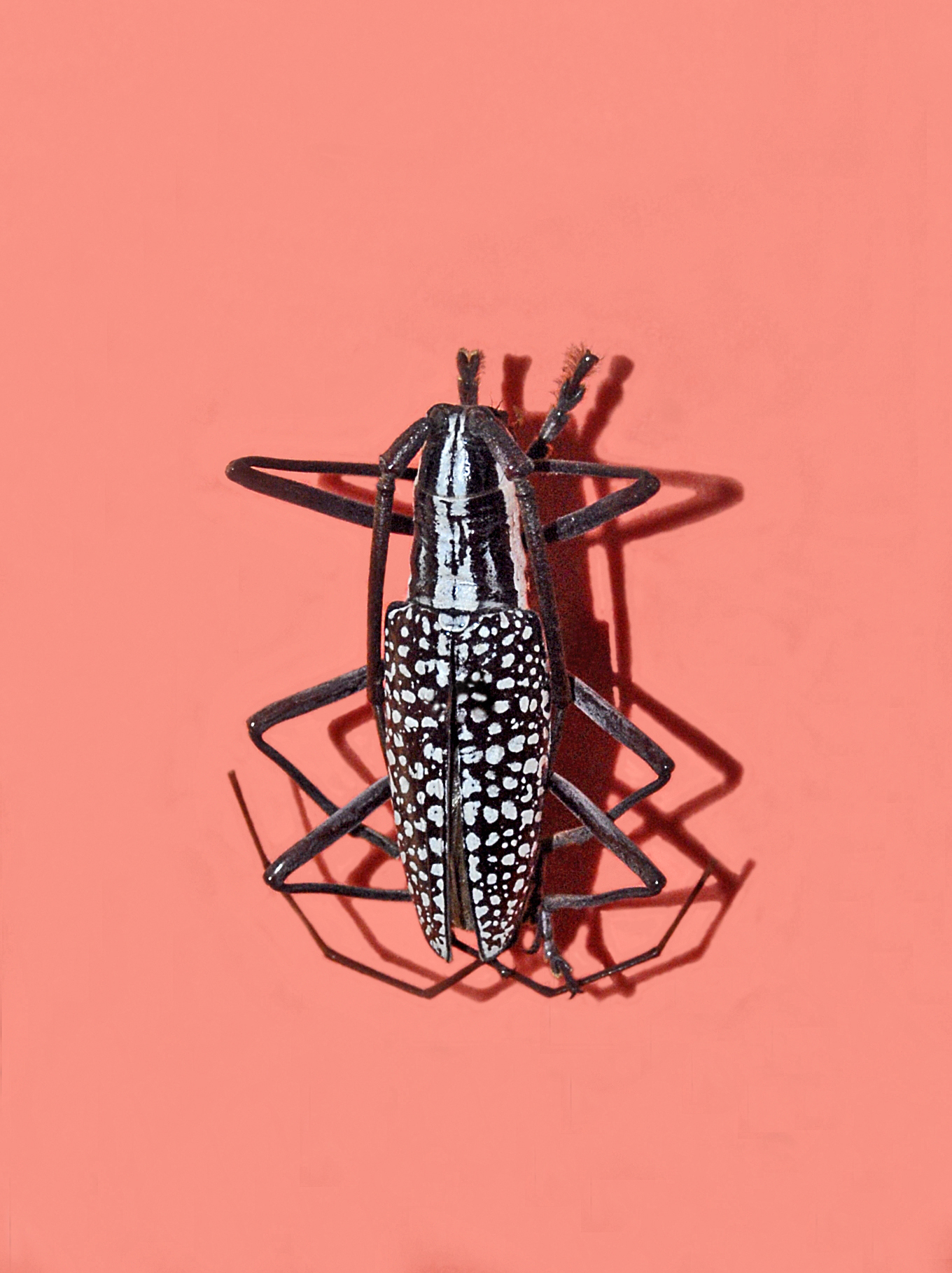
- Museum specimen

Scientific classification
- Domain: Eukaryota
- Kingdom: Animalia
- Phylum: Arthropoda
- Class: Insecta
- Order: Coleoptera
- Suborder: Polyphaga
- Infraorder: Cucujiformia
- Family: Cerambycidae
- Genus: Ptychodes
- Species: P. taeniotoides

Binomial name
- Ptychodes taeniotoides Thomson, 1865

= Ptychodes taeniotoides =

Species of beetle

Ptychodes taeniotoides is a species of flat-faced longhorn beetles in the subfamily Lamiinae.

== Description ==
Ptychodes taeniotoides can reach a length of about 22–24 millimetres (0.87–0.94 in).

== Subspecies ==
- Ptychodes taeniotoides niveisparsis Bates, 1872
- Ptychodes taeniotoides taeniotoides Thomson, 1865

== Distribution ==
This species can be found in Brazil and Colombia.
