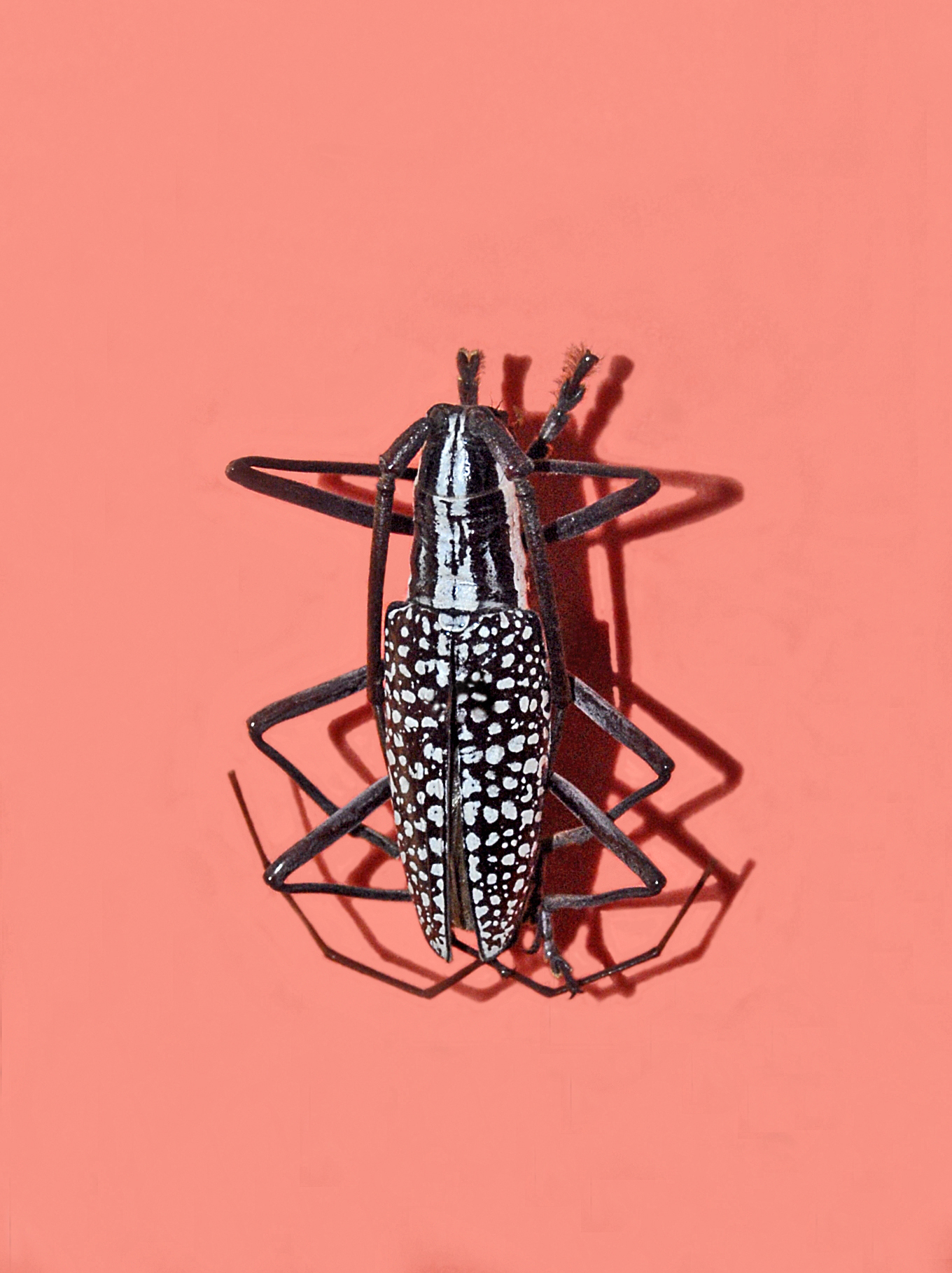
- Museum specimen of Ptychodes taeniotoides

Scientific classification
- Domain: Eukaryota
- Kingdom: Animalia
- Phylum: Arthropoda
- Class: Insecta
- Order: Coleoptera
- Suborder: Polyphaga
- Infraorder: Cucujiformia
- Family: Cerambycidae
- Subfamily: Lamiinae
- Genus: Ptychodes; Audinet-Serville, 1835

= Ptychodes =

Genus of beetles

Ptychodes is a genus of flat-faced longhorn beetles in the subfamily Lamiinae.

== Species ==
- Ptychodes alboguttatus Bates, 1880
- Ptychodes bifasciatus Dillon & Dillon, 1941
- Ptychodes dilloni Breuning, 1949
- Ptychodes guttulatus Dillon & Dillon, 1941
- Ptychodes mixtus Bates, 1880
- Ptychodes politus Audinet-Serville, 1835
- Ptychodes punctatus Dillon & Dillon, 1941
- Ptychodes taeniotoides Thomson, 1865
