= Nigrolamia farinosa =

Scientific classification
- Domain: Eukaryota
- Kingdom: Animalia
- Phylum: Arthropoda
- Class: Insecta
- Order: Coleoptera
- Suborder: Polyphaga
- Infraorder: Cucujiformia
- Family: Cerambycidae
- Tribe: Lamiini
- Genus: Nigrolamia
- Species: N. farinosa

Binomial name
- Nigrolamia farinosa (Bates, 1884)

Synonyms
- Melanopolia farinosa Bates, 1884; Monohammus clavatus Hintz, 1913; Monochamus farinosus (Bates, 1884)

Species of beetle

Nigrolamia farinosa is a species of beetle in the family Cerambycidae. It was described by Henry Walter Bates in 1884, originally under the genus Melanopolia. It is known from Gabon.
