= Melanopolia convexa =

Scientific classification
- Kingdom: Animalia
- Phylum: Arthropoda
- Class: Insecta
- Order: Coleoptera
- Suborder: Polyphaga
- Infraorder: Cucujiformia
- Family: Cerambycidae
- Genus: Melanopolia
- Species: M. convexa

Binomial name
- Melanopolia convexa Bates, 1884

Synonyms
- Monochamus clavifer Hintz, 1913; Monochamus convexus (Bates) Jordan, 1903; Pellamnia convexa (Bates) Dillon & Dillon, 1959

Species of beetle

Melanopolia convexa is a species of beetle in the family Cerambycidae. It was described by Henry Walter Bates in 1884.
