= Nigrolamia ogowensis =

Scientific classification
- Domain: Eukaryota
- Kingdom: Animalia
- Phylum: Arthropoda
- Class: Insecta
- Order: Coleoptera
- Suborder: Polyphaga
- Infraorder: Cucujiformia
- Family: Cerambycidae
- Tribe: Lamiini
- Genus: Nigrolamia
- Species: N. ogowensis

Binomial name
- Nigrolamia ogowensis Dillon & Dillon, 1959

Synonyms
- Monochamus ogowensis Dillon & Dillon, 1959

Species of beetle

Nigrolamia ogowensis is a species of beetle in the family Cerambycidae. It was described by Dillon and Dillon in 1959.
