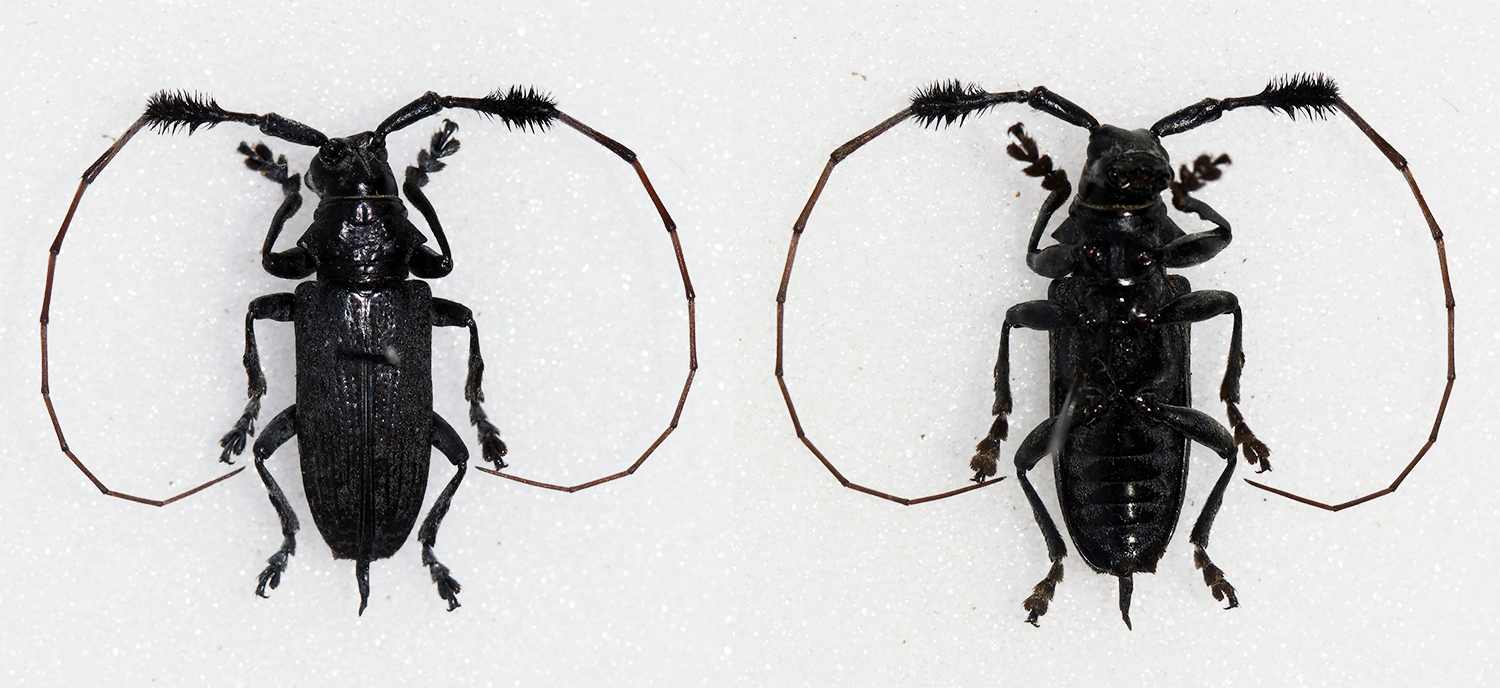

Scientific classification
- Kingdom: Animalia
- Phylum: Arthropoda
- Class: Insecta
- Order: Coleoptera
- Suborder: Polyphaga
- Infraorder: Cucujiformia
- Family: Cerambycidae
- Genus: Melanopolia
- Species: M. cincta

Binomial name
- Melanopolia cincta Jordan, 1903

= Melanopolia cincta =

Species of beetle

Melanopolia cincta is a species of beetle in the family Cerambycidae. It was described by Karl Jordan in 1903. It is known from Equatorial Guinea, Cameroon and Gabon. It contains the varietas Melanopolia cincta var. maculata.

== Subspecies ==
- Melanopolia cincta camerunensis Dillon & Dillon, 1959
- Melanopolia cincta cincta Jordan, 1903
