= Melanopolia gripha =

Scientific classification
- Kingdom: Animalia
- Phylum: Arthropoda
- Class: Insecta
- Order: Coleoptera
- Suborder: Polyphaga
- Infraorder: Cucujiformia
- Family: Cerambycidae
- Genus: Melanopolia
- Species: M. gripha

Binomial name
- Melanopolia gripha (Jordan, 1894)

Synonyms
- Monochamus griphus (Jordan) Jordan, 1903; Monohammus griphus Jordan, 1894; Pellamnia gripha (Jordan) Dillon & Dillon, 1959

Species of beetle

Melanopolia gripha is a species of beetle in the family Cerambycidae. It was described by Karl Jordan in 1894, originally under the genus Monohammus. It is known from Gabon, Cameroon, and the Democratic Republic of the Congo.
