= Melanopolia freundei =

Scientific classification
- Kingdom: Animalia
- Phylum: Arthropoda
- Class: Insecta
- Order: Coleoptera
- Suborder: Polyphaga
- Infraorder: Cucujiformia
- Family: Cerambycidae
- Genus: Melanopolia
- Species: M. freundei

Binomial name
- Melanopolia freundei Dillon & Dillon, 1959

Species of beetle

Melanopolia freundei is a species of beetle in the family Cerambycidae. It was described by Dillon and Dillon in 1959.
