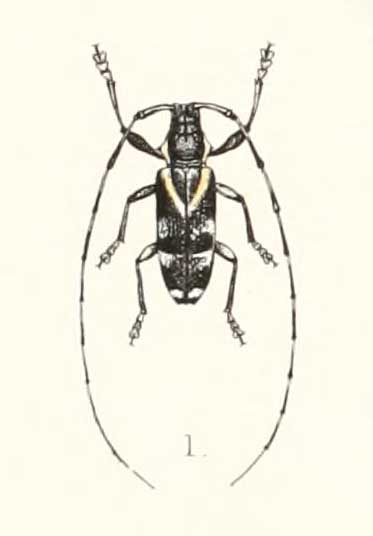

Scientific classification
- Kingdom: Animalia
- Phylum: Arthropoda
- Class: Insecta
- Order: Coleoptera
- Suborder: Polyphaga
- Infraorder: Cucujiformia
- Family: Cerambycidae
- Genus: Melanopolia
- Species: M. frenata

Binomial name
- Melanopolia frenata Bates, 1884

= Melanopolia frenata =

Species of beetle

Melanopolia frenata is a species of beetle in the family Cerambycidae. It was described by Henry Walter Bates in 1884. It is known from Gabon and the Democratic Republic of the Congo.

== Varietas ==
- Melanopolia frenata var. latefasciata Breuning, 1944
- Melanopolia frenata var. ligata (Jordan, 1894)
- Melanopolia frenata var. nubilosa Breuning, 1944
