= Nigrolamia =

Scientific classification
- Domain: Eukaryota
- Kingdom: Animalia
- Phylum: Arthropoda
- Class: Insecta
- Order: Coleoptera
- Suborder: Polyphaga
- Infraorder: Cucujiformia
- Family: Cerambycidae
- Tribe: Lamiini
- Genus: Nigrolamia; Dillon & Dillon, 1959

Genus of beetles

Nigrolamia is a genus of beetle in the family Cerambycidae.

== Species ==
- Nigrolamia borussa (Jordan, 1903)
- Nigrolamia farinosa (Bates, 1884)
- Nigrolamia ogowensis Dillon & Dillon, 1959
