= Nigrolamia borussa =

Scientific classification
- Domain: Eukaryota
- Kingdom: Animalia
- Phylum: Arthropoda
- Class: Insecta
- Order: Coleoptera
- Suborder: Polyphaga
- Infraorder: Cucujiformia
- Family: Cerambycidae
- Tribe: Lamiini
- Genus: Nigrolamia
- Species: N. borussa

Binomial name
- Nigrolamia borussa (Jordan, 1903)

Synonyms
- Monochamus borussus (Jordan, 1903)

Species of beetle

Nigrolamia borussa is a species of beetle in the family Cerambycidae. It was described by Karl Jordan in 1903.
