= Melanopolia catori =

Scientific classification
- Kingdom: Animalia
- Phylum: Arthropoda
- Class: Insecta
- Order: Coleoptera
- Suborder: Polyphaga
- Infraorder: Cucujiformia
- Family: Cerambycidae
- Genus: Melanopolia
- Species: M. catori

Binomial name
- Melanopolia catori Jordan, 1903

Species of beetle

Melanopolia catori is a species of beetle in the family Cerambycidae. It was described by Karl Jordan in 1903.

== Subspecies ==
- Melanopolia catori catori Jordan, 1903
- Melanopolia catori vittata Dillon & Dillon, 1959
