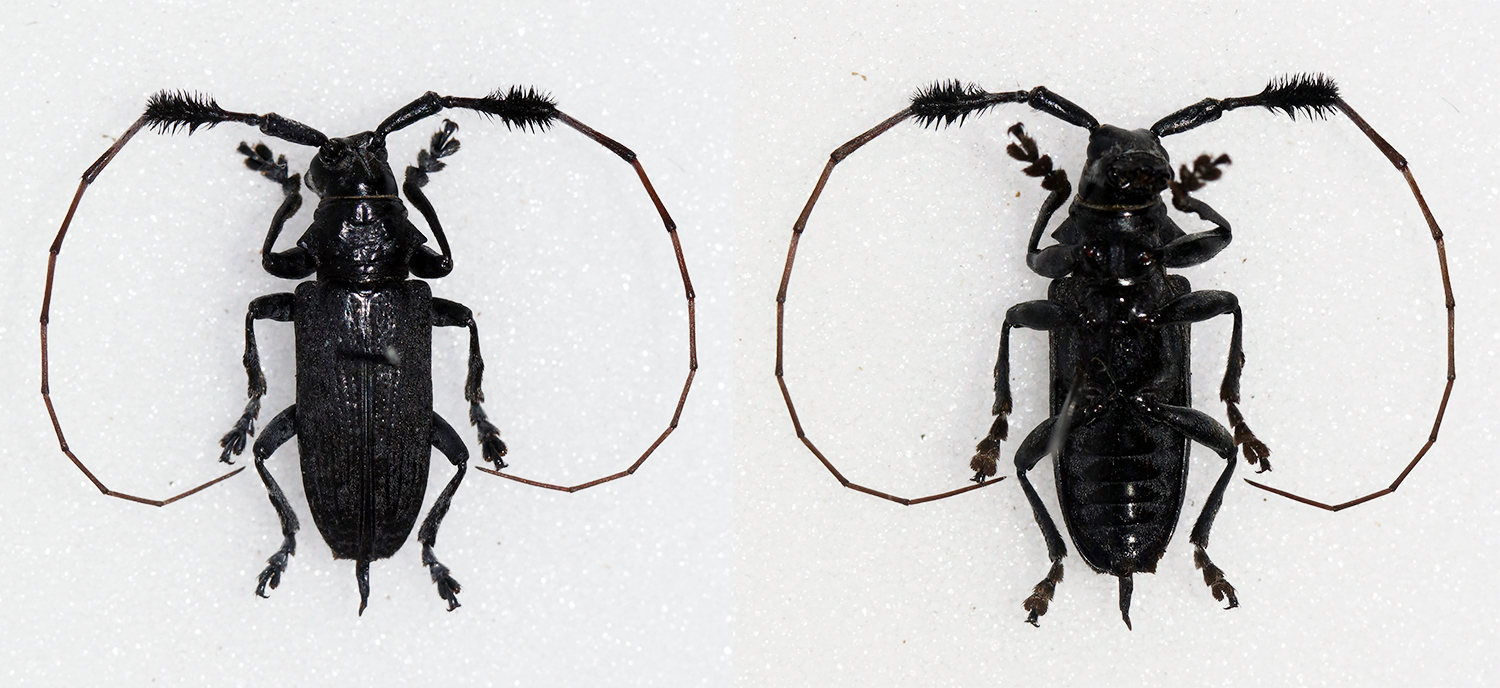
- Melanopolia cincta

Scientific classification
- Kingdom: Animalia
- Phylum: Arthropoda
- Class: Insecta
- Order: Coleoptera
- Suborder: Polyphaga
- Infraorder: Cucujiformia
- Family: Cerambycidae
- Tribe: Lamiini
- Genus: Melanopolia; Bates, 1884

= Melanopolia =

Genus of beetles

Melanopolia is a genus of longhorn beetles of the subfamily Lamiinae, containing the following species:

subgenus Melanopolia

- Melanopolia brevicornis Dillon & Dillon, 1959
- Melanopolia catori Jordan, 1903
- Melanopolia cincta Jordan, 1903
- Melanopolia cotytta Dillon & Dillon, 1959
- Melanopolia frenata Bates, 1884
- Melanopolia freundei Dillon & Dillon, 1959
- Melanopolia ligondesi Lepesme, 1952
- Melanopolia longiscapa Breuning, 1935
- Melanopolia lysida Dillon & Dillon, 1959
- Melanopolia ruficornis Breuning, 1955

subgenus Pellamnia

- Melanopolia convexa Bates, 1884
- Melanopolia gripha (Jordan, 1894)
