= Oxylamia flavoguttata =

Scientific classification
- Kingdom: Animalia
- Phylum: Arthropoda
- Class: Insecta
- Order: Coleoptera
- Suborder: Polyphaga
- Infraorder: Cucujiformia
- Family: Cerambycidae
- Genus: Oxylamia
- Species: O. flavoguttata

Binomial name
- Oxylamia flavoguttata (Breuning, 1935)

Synonyms
- Tomolamia flavoguttata Breuning, 1935

Species of beetle

Oxylamia flavoguttata is a species of beetle in the family Cerambycidae. It was described by Stephan von Breuning in 1935, originally under the genus Tomolamia.
