= Oxylamia ochreostictica =

Scientific classification
- Kingdom: Animalia
- Phylum: Arthropoda
- Class: Insecta
- Order: Coleoptera
- Suborder: Polyphaga
- Infraorder: Cucujiformia
- Family: Cerambycidae
- Genus: Oxylamia
- Species: O. ochreostictica

Binomial name
- Oxylamia ochreostictica (Breuning, 1940)

Synonyms
- Tomolamia ochreostictica Breuning, 1940

Species of beetle

Oxylamia ochreostictica is a species of beetle in the family Cerambycidae. It was described by Stephan von Breuning in 1940, originally under the genus Tomolamia.
