= Oxylamia methneri =

Scientific classification
- Kingdom: Animalia
- Phylum: Arthropoda
- Class: Insecta
- Order: Coleoptera
- Suborder: Polyphaga
- Infraorder: Cucujiformia
- Family: Cerambycidae
- Genus: Oxylamia
- Species: O. basilewskyi

Binomial name
- Oxylamia basilewskyi Breuning, 1975

Synonyms
- Oxylamia basilewskyi Breuning, 1975

Species of insect

Oxylamia basilewskyi is a species of beetle in the family Cerambycidae. It was described by Stephan von Breuning in 1975. It is known from Tanzania.
