= Oxylamia cordifer =

Scientific classification
- Kingdom: Animalia
- Phylum: Arthropoda
- Class: Insecta
- Order: Coleoptera
- Suborder: Polyphaga
- Infraorder: Cucujiformia
- Family: Cerambycidae
- Genus: Oxylamia
- Species: O. cordifer

Binomial name
- Oxylamia cordifer (Chevrolat, 1856)

Synonyms
- Cordoxylamia cordifera (Chevrolat, 1856); Monohammus cordifer Chevrolat, 1856

Species of beetle

Oxylamia cordifer is a species of beetle in the family Cerambycidae. It was described by Chevrolat in 1856, originally under the genus Monohammus. It is known from the Democratic Republic of the Congo, the Republic of the Congo, Gabon, Nigeria, the Ivory Coast, and Cameroon.
