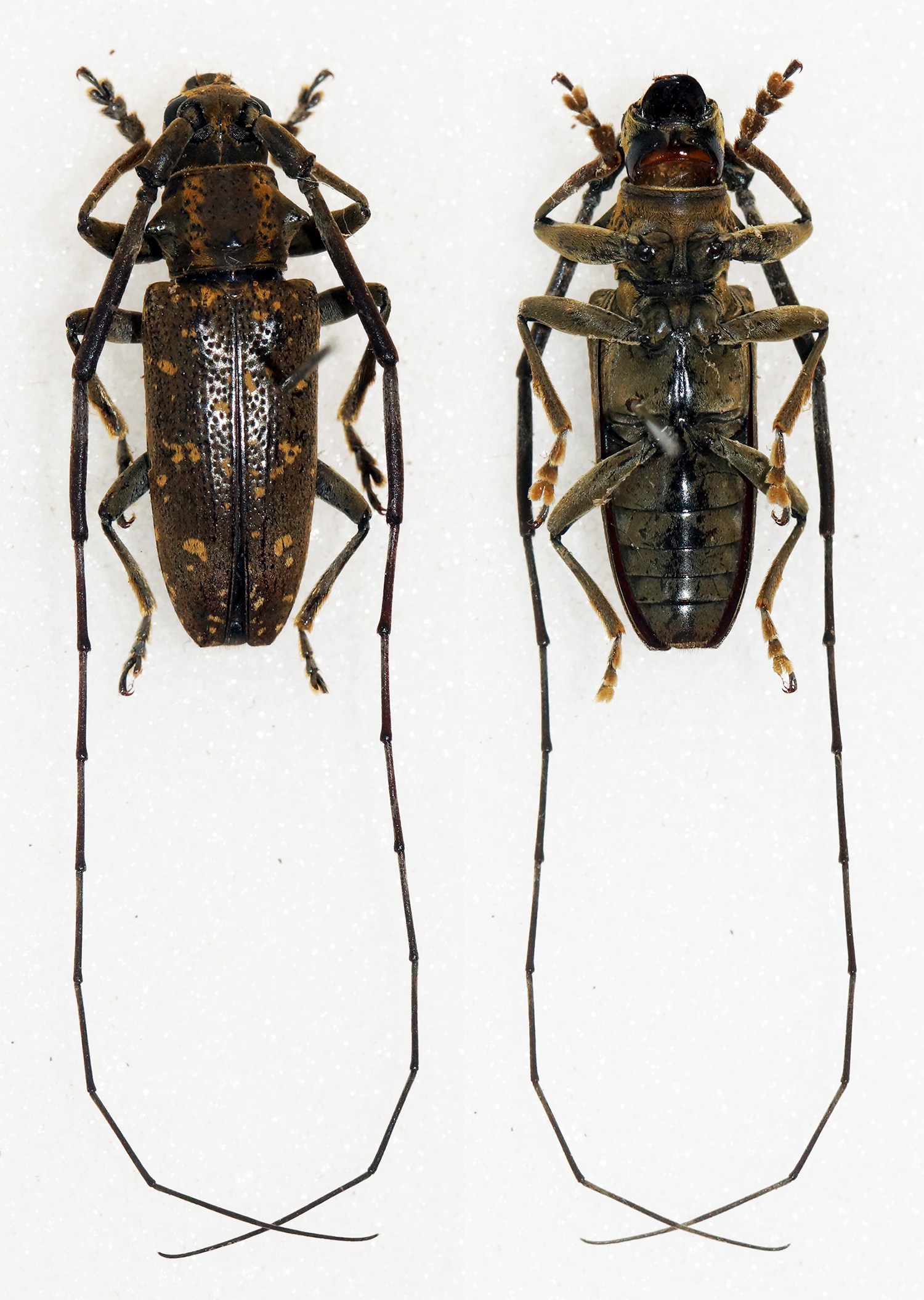

Scientific classification
- Kingdom: Animalia
- Phylum: Arthropoda
- Class: Insecta
- Order: Coleoptera
- Suborder: Polyphaga
- Infraorder: Cucujiformia
- Family: Cerambycidae
- Genus: Oxylamia
- Species: O. fulvaster

Binomial name
- Oxylamia fulvaster (Jordan, 1894)

Synonyms
- Monohammus fulvaster Jordan, 1894; Oxyhammus fulvaster (Jordan, 1894); Tomolamia fulvaster (Jordan, 1894)

= Oxylamia fulvaster =

Species of beetle

Oxylamia fulvaster is a species of beetle in the family Cerambycidae. It was described by Karl Jordan in 1894, originally under the genus Monohammus. It is known from Gabon, Cameroon, the Republic of the Congo, and the Democratic Republic of the Congo.
