= Oxylamia tepahius =

Scientific classification
- Kingdom: Animalia
- Phylum: Arthropoda
- Class: Insecta
- Order: Coleoptera
- Suborder: Polyphaga
- Infraorder: Cucujiformia
- Family: Cerambycidae
- Genus: Oxylamia
- Species: O. tepahius

Binomial name
- Oxylamia tepahius (Dillon & Dillon, 1959)

Species of beetle

Oxylamia tepahius is a species of beetle in the family Cerambycidae. It was described by Dillon and Dillon in 1959. It is known from Cameroon.
