= Tomolamia unicoloripennis =

Scientific classification
- Kingdom: Animalia
- Phylum: Arthropoda
- Class: Insecta
- Order: Coleoptera
- Suborder: Polyphaga
- Infraorder: Cucujiformia
- Family: Cerambycidae
- Genus: Tomolamia
- Species: T. unicoloripennis

Binomial name
- Tomolamia unicoloripennis Breuning, 1977

Species of beetle

Tomolamia unicoloripennis is a species of beetle in the family Cerambycidae. It was described by Stephan von Breuning in 1977.
