= Oxylamia biplagiata =

Scientific classification
- Kingdom: Animalia
- Phylum: Arthropoda
- Class: Insecta
- Order: Coleoptera
- Suborder: Polyphaga
- Infraorder: Cucujiformia
- Family: Cerambycidae
- Genus: Oxylamia
- Species: O. biplagiata

Binomial name
- Oxylamia biplagiata (Breuning, 1935)

Species of beetle

Oxylamia biplagiata is a species of beetle in the family Cerambycidae. It was described by Stephan von Breuning in 1935.
