= Oxylamia trianguligera =

Scientific classification
- Kingdom: Animalia
- Phylum: Arthropoda
- Class: Insecta
- Order: Coleoptera
- Suborder: Polyphaga
- Infraorder: Cucujiformia
- Family: Cerambycidae
- Genus: Oxylamia
- Species: O. trianguligera

Binomial name
- Oxylamia trianguligera (Aurivillius, 1917)

Synonyms
- Monohammus trianguliger Aurivillius, 1917; Pseudoxylamia trianguligera (Aurivillius, 1917)

Species of beetle

Oxylamia trianguligera is a species of beetle in the family Cerambycidae. It was described by Per Olof Christopher Aurivillius in 1917. It is known from Gabon, the Republic of the Congo, Cameroon, and the Democratic Republic of the Congo.
