= Tomolamia irrorata =

Scientific classification
- Kingdom: Animalia
- Phylum: Arthropoda
- Class: Insecta
- Order: Coleoptera
- Suborder: Polyphaga
- Infraorder: Cucujiformia
- Family: Cerambycidae
- Genus: Tomolamia
- Species: T. irrorata

Binomial name
- Tomolamia irrorata Lameere, 1893

Synonyms
- Oxyhammus griseotinctus Hintz, 1919

Species of beetle

Tomolamia irrorata is a species of beetle in the family Cerambycidae. It was described by Lameere in 1893.
