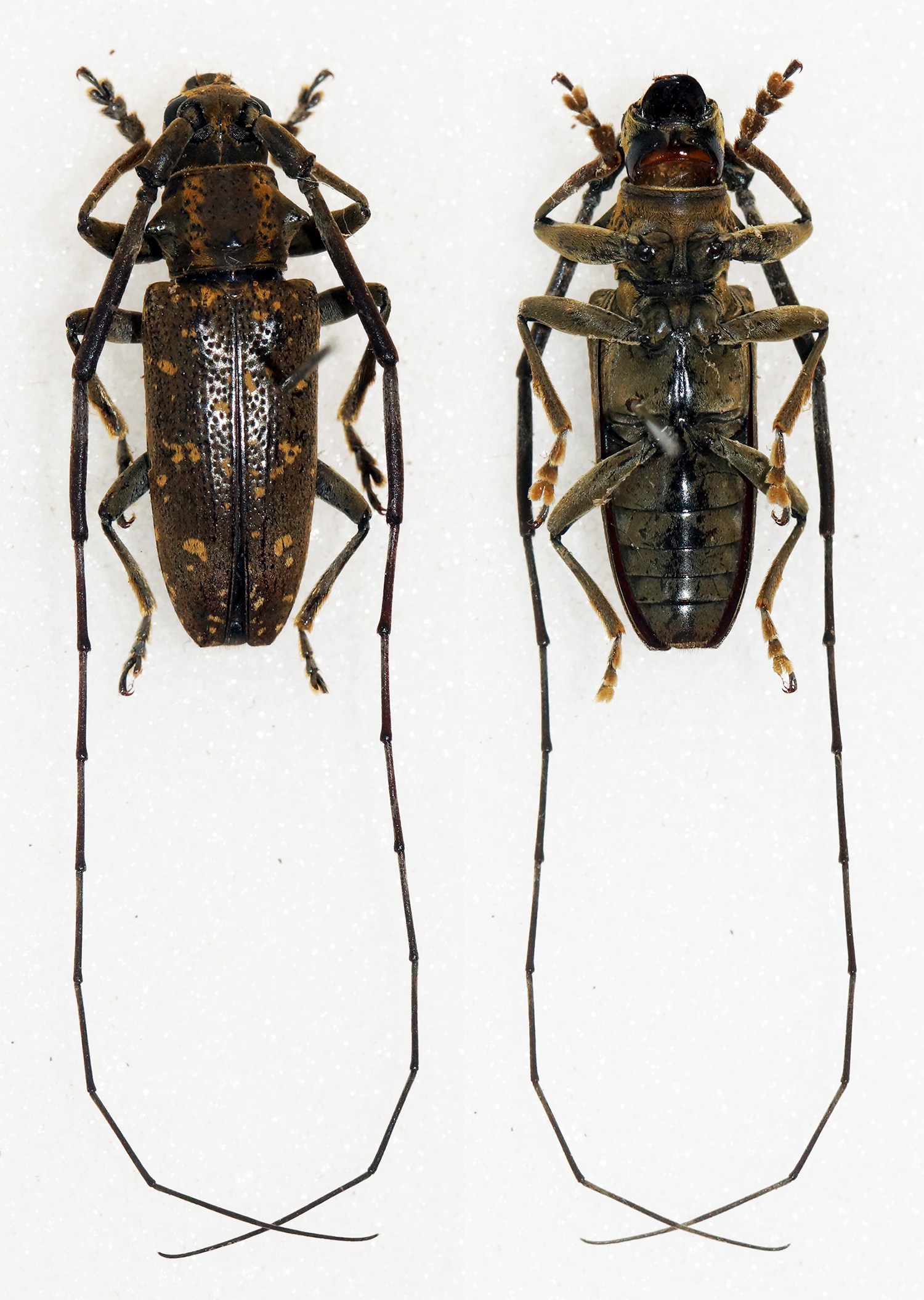
- Oxylamia fulvaster

Scientific classification
- Kingdom: Animalia
- Phylum: Arthropoda
- Class: Insecta
- Order: Coleoptera
- Suborder: Polyphaga
- Infraorder: Cucujiformia
- Family: Cerambycidae
- Tribe: Lamiini
- Genus: Oxylamia

= Oxylamia =

Genus of beetles

Oxylamia is a genus of longhorn beetles of the subfamily Lamiinae, containing the following species:

subgenus Cordoxylamia

- Oxylamia cordifer (Chevrolat, 1856)

subgenus Oxylamia

- Oxylamia basilewskyi Breuning, 1975
- Oxylamia binigrovitticollis Breuning, 1969
- Oxylamia biplagiata (Breuning, 1935)
- Oxylamia flavoguttata (Breuning, 1935)
- Oxylamia fulvaster (Jordan, 1894)
- Oxylamia ochreostictica (Breuning, 1940)

subgenus Pseudoxylamia

- Oxylamia tepahius (Dillon & Dillon, 1959)
- Oxylamia trianguligera (Aurivillius, 1917)
