= Tomolamia =

Scientific classification
- Kingdom: Animalia
- Phylum: Arthropoda
- Class: Insecta
- Order: Coleoptera
- Suborder: Polyphaga
- Infraorder: Cucujiformia
- Family: Cerambycidae
- Tribe: Lamiini
- Genus: Tomolamia

Genus of beetles

Tomolamia is a genus of longhorn beetles of the subfamily Lamiinae, containing the following species:

- Tomolamia irrorata Lameere, 1893
- Tomolamia unicoloripennis Breuning, 1977
