= Periaptodes potemnoides =

Scientific classification
- Domain: Eukaryota
- Kingdom: Animalia
- Phylum: Arthropoda
- Class: Insecta
- Order: Coleoptera
- Suborder: Polyphaga
- Infraorder: Cucujiformia
- Family: Cerambycidae
- Tribe: Lamiini
- Genus: Periaptodes
- Species: P. potemnoides

Binomial name
- Periaptodes potemnoides Kriesche, 1936 inq.

Synonyms
- Potemnemus potemnoides (Kriesche, 1936)

Species of beetle

Periaptodes potemnoides is a species of beetle in the family Cerambycidae. It was described by Kriesche in 1936.
