= Periaptodes lictor =

Scientific classification
- Domain: Eukaryota
- Kingdom: Animalia
- Phylum: Arthropoda
- Class: Insecta
- Order: Coleoptera
- Suborder: Polyphaga
- Infraorder: Cucujiformia
- Family: Cerambycidae
- Tribe: Lamiini
- Genus: Periaptodes
- Species: P. lictor

Binomial name
- Periaptodes lictor Pascoe, 1866

Synonyms
- Potemnemus lictor (Pascoe, 1866)

Species of beetle

Periaptodes lictor is a species of beetle in the family Cerambycidae. It was described by Francis Polkinghorne Pascoe in 1866. It is known from Indonesia.
