= Periaptodes paratestator =

Scientific classification
- Kingdom: Animalia
- Phylum: Arthropoda
- Class: Insecta
- Order: Coleoptera
- Suborder: Polyphaga
- Infraorder: Cucujiformia
- Family: Cerambycidae
- Genus: Periaptodes
- Species: P. paratestator

Binomial name
- Periaptodes paratestator Breuning, 1980

Synonyms
- Potemnemus paratestator (Breuning, 1980)

Species of beetle

Periaptodes paratestator is a species of beetle in the family Cerambycidae. It is known from Stephan von Breuning in 1980.
