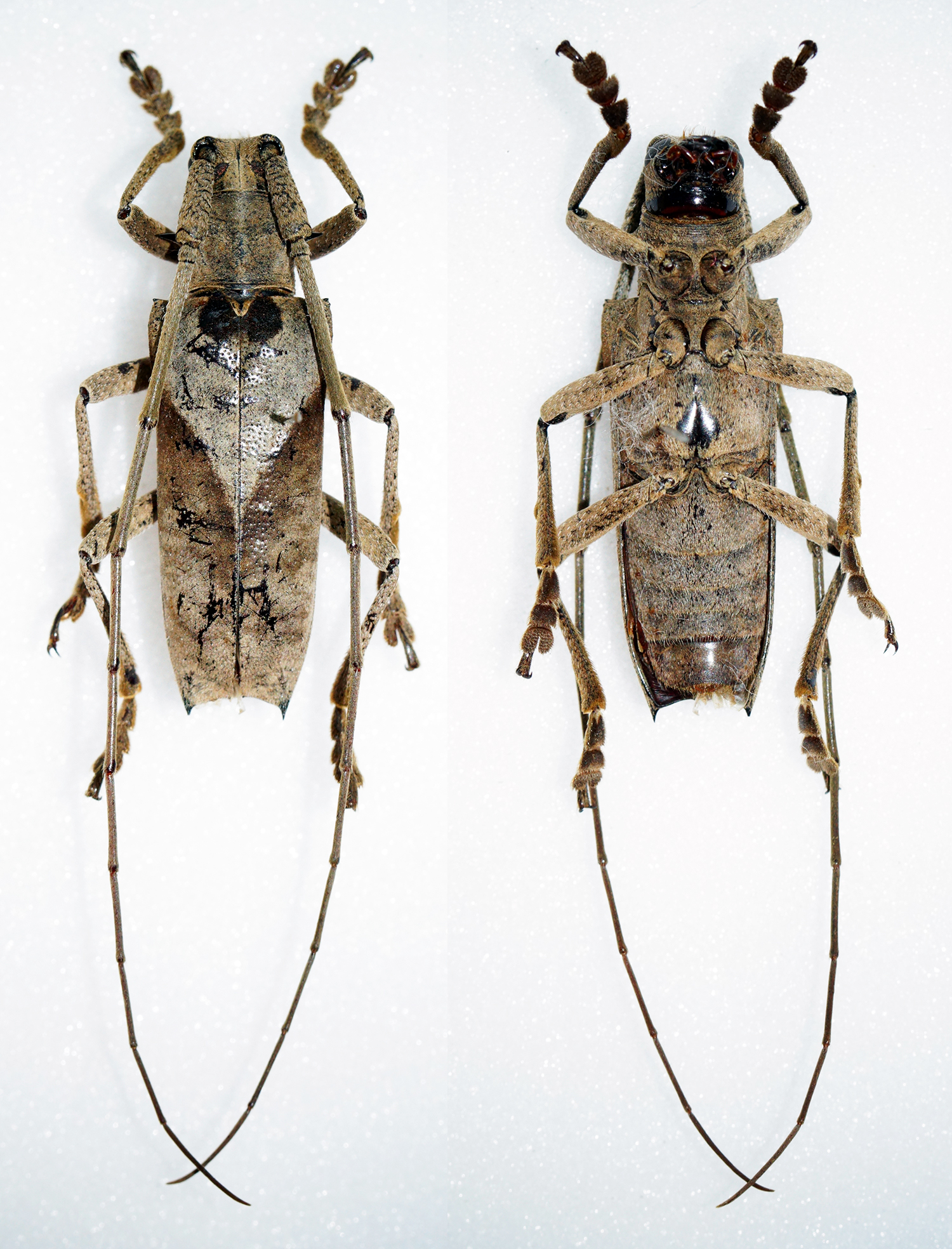
- Periaptodes frater

Scientific classification
- Domain: Eukaryota
- Kingdom: Animalia
- Phylum: Arthropoda
- Class: Insecta
- Order: Coleoptera
- Suborder: Polyphaga
- Infraorder: Cucujiformia
- Family: Cerambycidae
- Tribe: Lamiini
- Genus: Periaptodes

= Periaptodes =

Genus of beetles

Periaptodes is a genus of longhorn beetles of the subfamily Lamiinae, containing the following species:

- Periaptodes frater Van der Poll, 1887
- Periaptodes lictor Pascoe, 1866
- Periaptodes olivieri Thomson, 1864
- Periaptodes paratestator Breuning, 1980
- Periaptodes potemnoides Kriesche, 1936 inq.
- Periaptodes testator Pascoe, 1866
