= Periaptodes olivieri =

Scientific classification
- Kingdom: Animalia
- Phylum: Arthropoda
- Class: Insecta
- Order: Coleoptera
- Suborder: Polyphaga
- Infraorder: Cucujiformia
- Family: Cerambycidae
- Genus: Periaptodes
- Species: P. olivieri

Binomial name
- Periaptodes olivieri Thomson, 1864

Synonyms
- Periaptodes buruensis Jordan, 1894; Potemnemus olivieri (Thomson, 1864)

Species of beetle

Periaptodes olivieri is a species of beetle in the family Cerambycidae. It was described by James Thomson in 1864. It is known from Moluccas.
