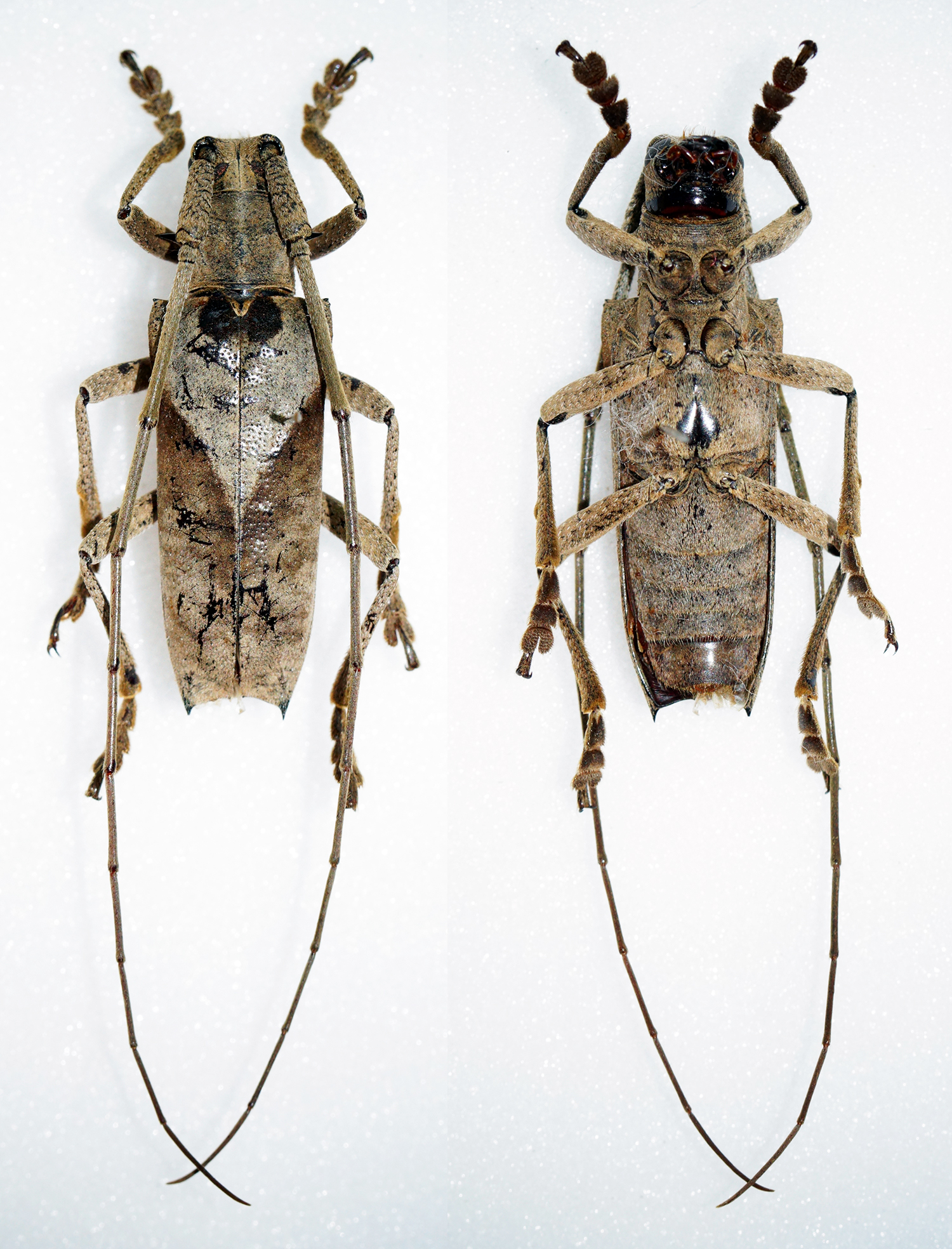

Scientific classification
- Domain: Eukaryota
- Kingdom: Animalia
- Phylum: Arthropoda
- Class: Insecta
- Order: Coleoptera
- Suborder: Polyphaga
- Infraorder: Cucujiformia
- Family: Cerambycidae
- Tribe: Lamiini
- Genus: Periaptodes
- Species: P. frater

Binomial name
- Periaptodes frater Van der Poll, 1887

Synonyms
- Periaptodes frater salomonum Kriesche, 1936; Potemnemus frater (Van der Poll, 1887)

= Periaptodes frater =

Species of beetle

Periaptodes frater is a species of beetle in the family Cerambycidae. It was described by Van der Poll in 1887. It is known from the Solomon Islands, New Britain, and possibly Australia.
