= Hotarionomus blattoides =

Scientific classification
- Kingdom: Animalia
- Phylum: Arthropoda
- Class: Insecta
- Order: Coleoptera
- Suborder: Polyphaga
- Infraorder: Cucujiformia
- Family: Cerambycidae
- Genus: Hotarionomus
- Species: H. blattoides

Binomial name
- Hotarionomus blattoides Pascoe, 1856

Synonyms
- Monohammus blattoides Pascoe, 1856; Otarionomus blattoides (Pascoe, 1856) (unjustified emendation)

Species of beetle

Hotarionomus blattoides is a species of beetle in the family Cerambycidae. It was described by Francis Polkinghorne Pascoe in 1856, originally under the genus Monohammus. It is known from Malaysia and Indonesia.

== Subspecies ==
Hotarionomus blattoides blattoides is a species of beetle in the family Cerambycidae. It was described by Francis Polkinghorne Pascoe in 1856, originally under the genus Monohammus. It is known from Malaysia and Indonesia.

== Scientific synonyms ==
- Monohammus blattoides Pascoe, 1856 o
- Otarionomus blattoides (Pascoe, 1856) (unjustified emendation)

=== Explanations ===
- o original combination
- u.em. unjustified emendation - proposed alternative spelling of scientific name when not justified by international code of nomenclature
