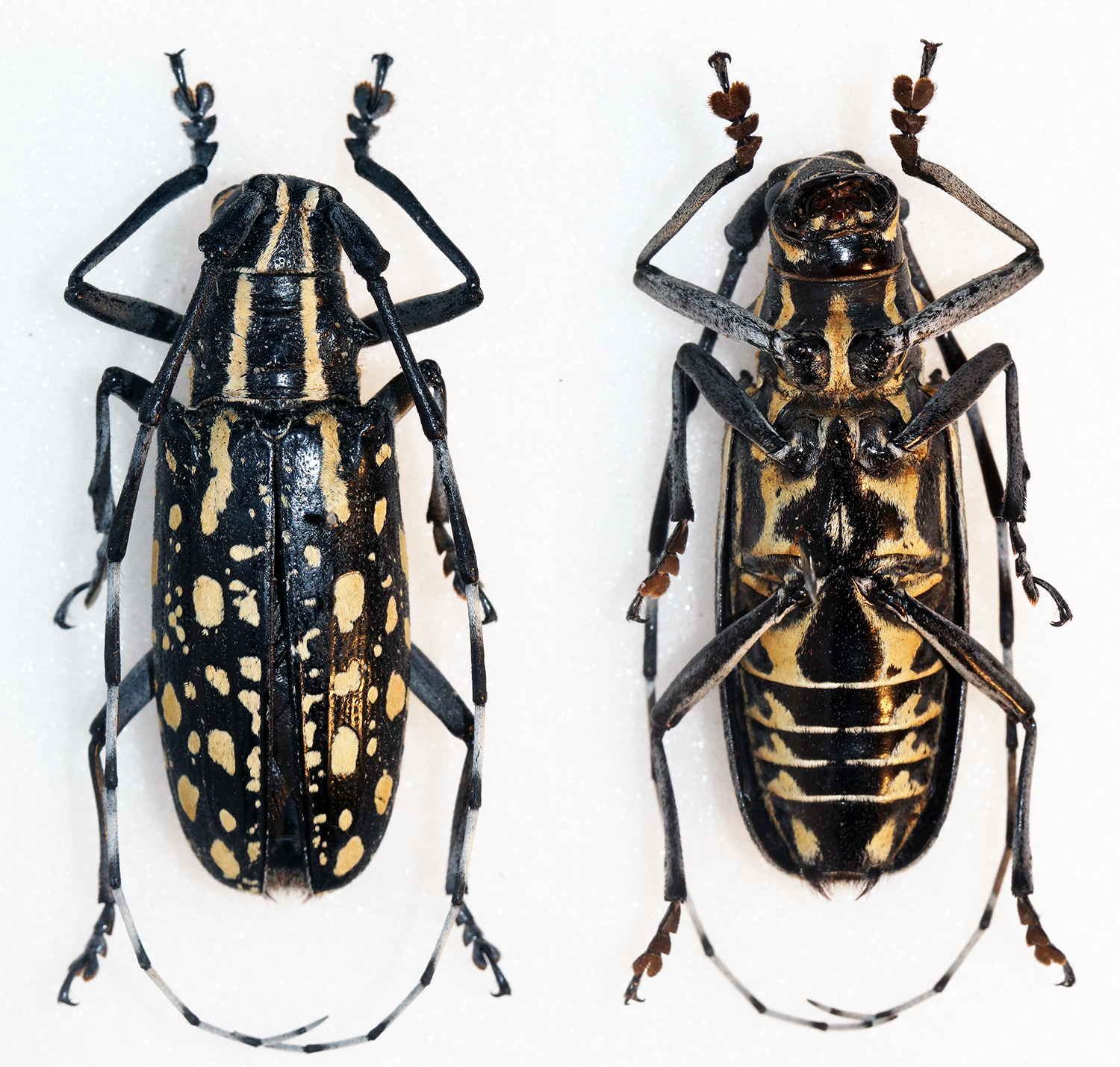
- Hotarionomus ilocanus

Scientific classification
- Kingdom: Animalia
- Phylum: Arthropoda
- Class: Insecta
- Order: Coleoptera
- Suborder: Polyphaga
- Infraorder: Cucujiformia
- Family: Cerambycidae
- Subfamily: Lamiinae
- Genus: Hotarionomus

= Hotarionomus =

Genus of beetles

Hotarionomus is a genus of longhorn beetles of the subfamily Lamiinae, containing the following species:

- Hotarionomus abbreviatus Breuning, 1948
- Hotarionomus blattoides (Pascoe, 1856)
- Hotarionomus ilocanus Heller, 1899
