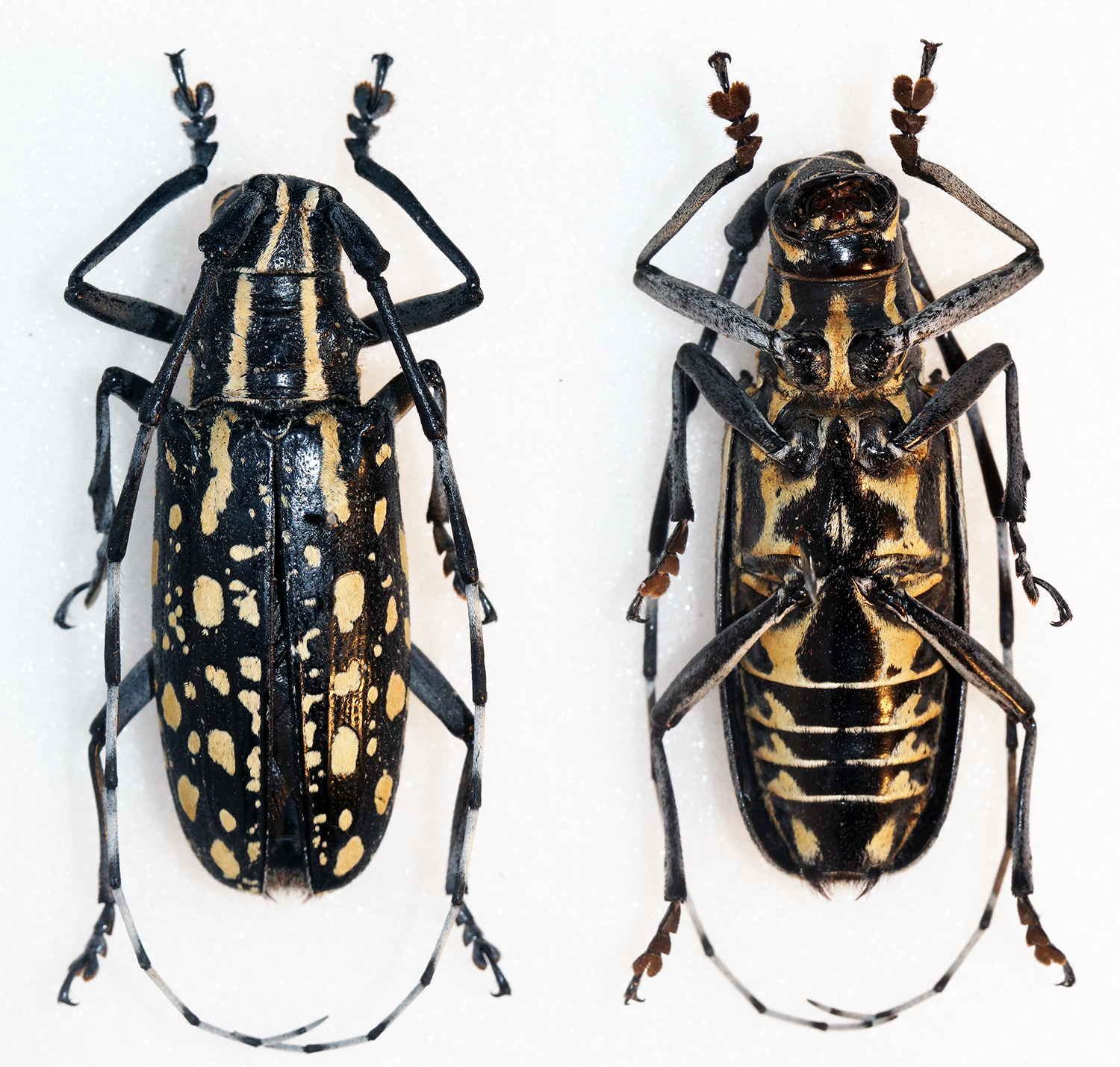

Scientific classification
- Kingdom: Animalia
- Phylum: Arthropoda
- Class: Insecta
- Order: Coleoptera
- Suborder: Polyphaga
- Infraorder: Cucujiformia
- Family: Cerambycidae
- Genus: Hotarionomus
- Species: H. ilocanus

Binomial name
- Hotarionomus ilocanus Heller, 1899

Synonyms
- Otarionomus ilocanus Heller, 1899

= Hotarionomus ilocanus =

Species of beetle

Hotarionomus ilocanus is a species of beetle in the family Cerambycidae. It was described by Heller in 1899, originally under the genus Otarionomus. It is known from the Philippines.
