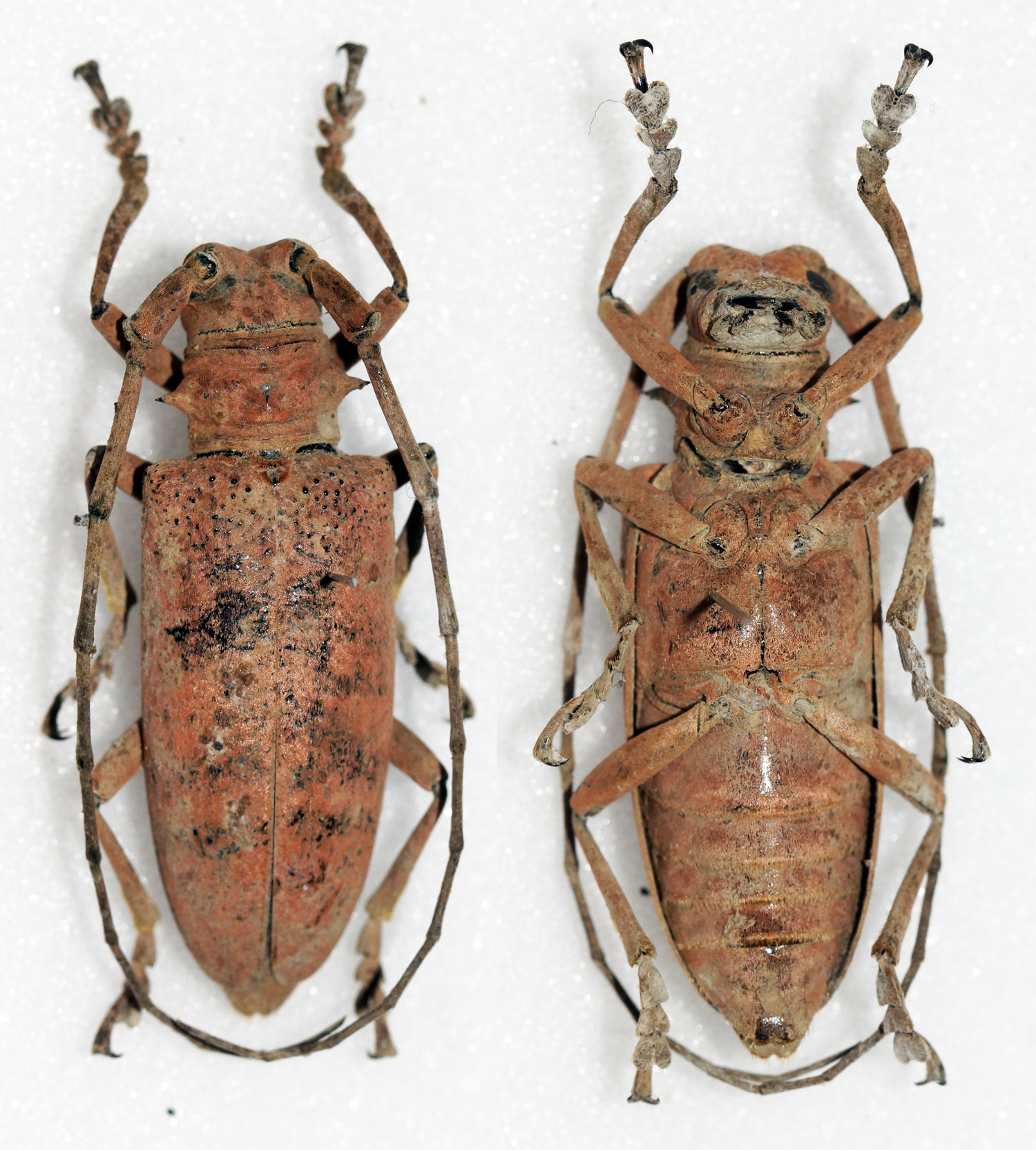

Scientific classification
- Domain: Eukaryota
- Kingdom: Animalia
- Phylum: Arthropoda
- Class: Insecta
- Order: Coleoptera
- Suborder: Polyphaga
- Infraorder: Cucujiformia
- Family: Cerambycidae
- Genus: Thestus
- Species: T. philippensis

Binomial name
- Thestus philippensis Schwarzer, 1929

= Thestus philippensis =

Species of beetle

Thestus philippensis is a species of beetle in the family Cerambycidae. It was described by Bernhard Schwarzer in 1929. It is known from the Philippines.
