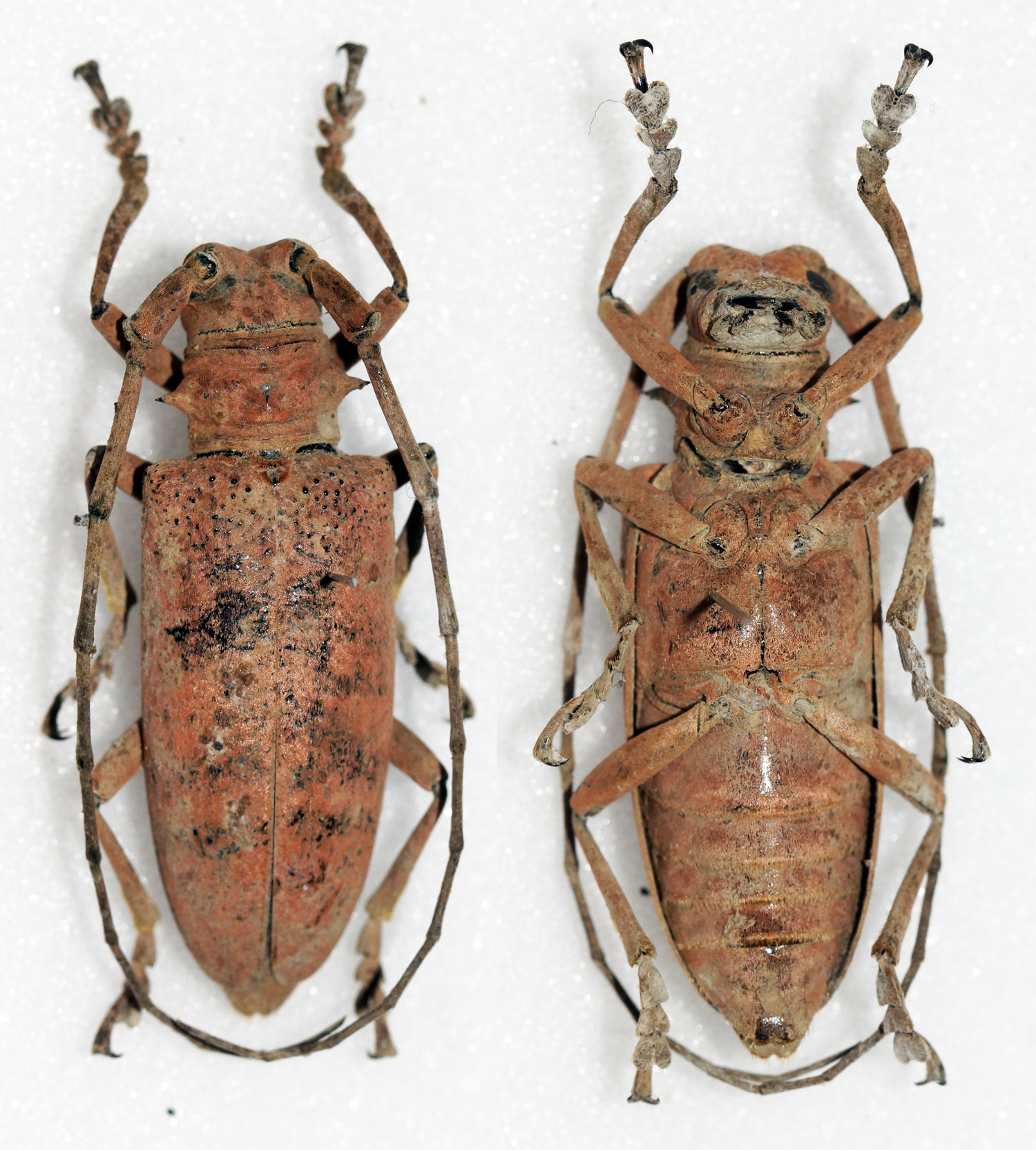
- Thestus philippensis (female)

Scientific classification
- Domain: Eukaryota
- Kingdom: Animalia
- Phylum: Arthropoda
- Class: Insecta
- Order: Coleoptera
- Suborder: Polyphaga
- Infraorder: Cucujiformia
- Family: Cerambycidae
- Genus: Thestus

= Thestus =

Genus of beetles

Thestus is a genus of longhorn beetles of the subfamily Lamiinae, containing the following species:

- Thestus alexandra (Thomson, 1878)
- Thestus chassoti Breuning, 1973
- Thestus oncideroides Pascoe, 1866
- Thestus philippensis Schwarzer, 1929
