= Thestus oncideroides =

Scientific classification
- Domain: Eukaryota
- Kingdom: Animalia
- Phylum: Arthropoda
- Class: Insecta
- Order: Coleoptera
- Suborder: Polyphaga
- Infraorder: Cucujiformia
- Family: Cerambycidae
- Genus: Thestus
- Species: T. oncideroides

Binomial name
- Thestus oncideroides Pascoe, 1866

Species of beetle

Thestus oncideroides is a species of beetle in the family Cerambycidae. It was described by Francis Polkinghorne Pascoe in 1866. It is known from Sumatra and Malaysia.
