= Thestus alexandra =

Scientific classification
- Domain: Eukaryota
- Kingdom: Animalia
- Phylum: Arthropoda
- Class: Insecta
- Order: Coleoptera
- Suborder: Polyphaga
- Infraorder: Cucujiformia
- Family: Cerambycidae
- Genus: Thestus
- Species: T. alexandra

Binomial name
- Thestus alexandra (Thomson, 1878)

Synonyms
- Archidice alexandra J. Thomson, 1878; Anammophas alexandrae (Thomson, 1878; Thestus alexandrae (J. Thomson, 1878); Thestus armatus Gahan, 1893

Species of beetle

Thestus alexandra is a species of beetle in the family Cerambycidae. It was described by James Thomson in 1878. It is known from Sumatra and Malaysia.
