= Peribasis helenor =

Scientific classification
- Domain: Eukaryota
- Kingdom: Animalia
- Phylum: Arthropoda
- Class: Insecta
- Order: Coleoptera
- Suborder: Polyphaga
- Infraorder: Cucujiformia
- Family: Cerambycidae
- Tribe: Lamiini
- Genus: Peribasis
- Species: P. helenor

Binomial name
- Peribasis helenor (Newman, 1851)

Synonyms
- Monohammus aspersus Pascoe, 1856; Monohammus helenor Newman, 1851; Peribasis adspersa (Pascoe) Thomson, 1864 (misspelling)

Species of beetle

Peribasis helenor is a species of beetle in the family Cerambycidae. It was described by Newman in 1851, originally under the genus Monohammus. It is known from Malaysia, India, and Sumatra.
