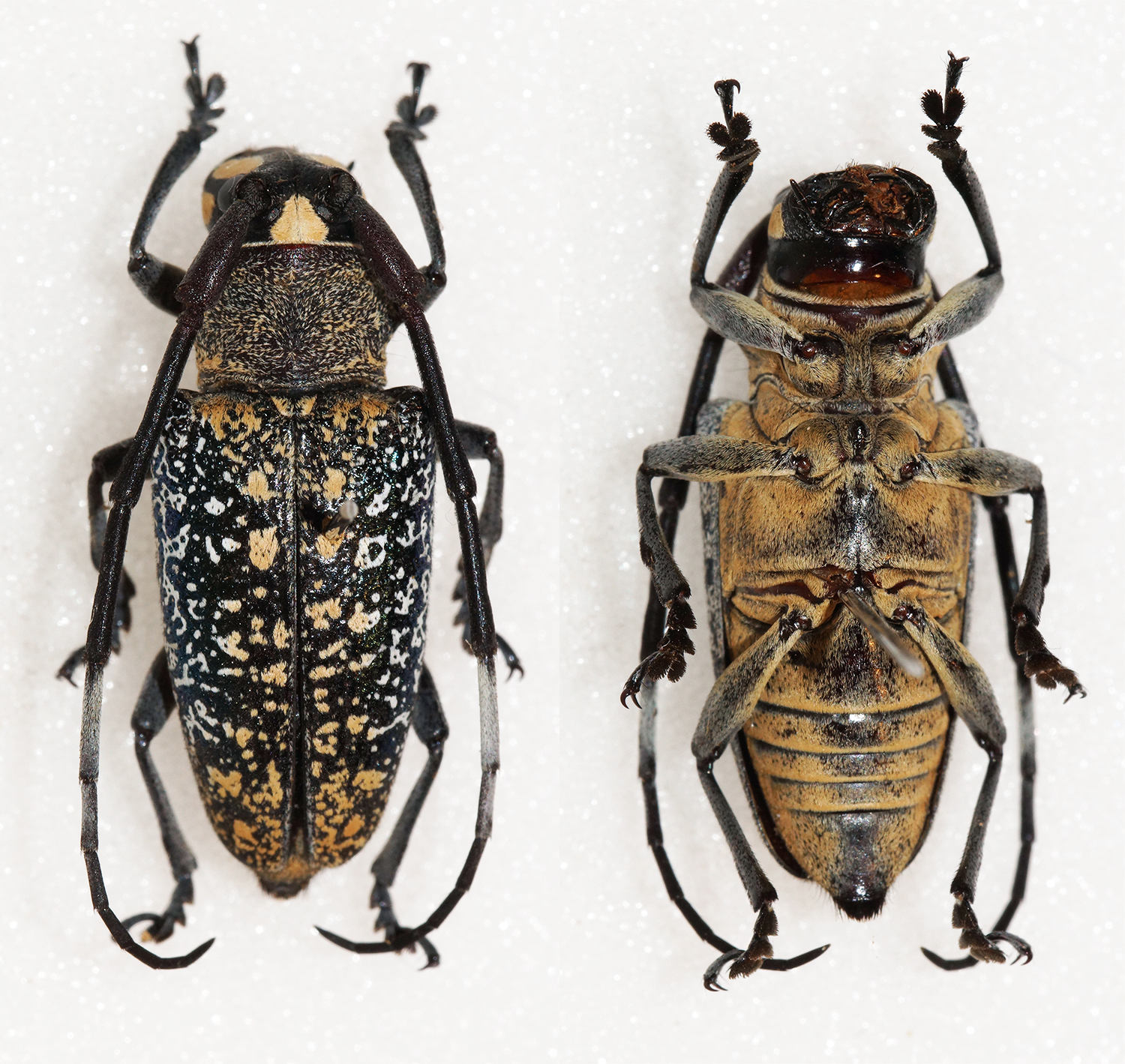

Scientific classification
- Kingdom: Animalia
- Phylum: Arthropoda
- Class: Insecta
- Order: Coleoptera
- Suborder: Polyphaga
- Infraorder: Cucujiformia
- Family: Cerambycidae
- Genus: Peribasis
- Species: P. pubicollis

Binomial name
- Peribasis pubicollis Pascoe, 1866

Synonyms
- Peribasis albisparsa Ritsema, 1888

= Peribasis pubicollis =

Species of beetle

Peribasis pubicollis is a species of beetle in the family Cerambycidae. It was described by Francis Polkinghorne Pascoe in 1866. It is known from Singapore, Borneo, Bhutan and Malaysia.
