= Peribasis larvata =

Scientific classification
- Domain: Eukaryota
- Kingdom: Animalia
- Phylum: Arthropoda
- Class: Insecta
- Order: Coleoptera
- Suborder: Polyphaga
- Infraorder: Cucujiformia
- Family: Cerambycidae
- Tribe: Lamiini
- Genus: Peribasis
- Species: P. larvata

Binomial name
- Peribasis larvata (White, 1858)

Synonyms
- Monohammus larvatus White, 1858

Species of beetle

Peribasis larvata is a species of beetle in the family Cerambycidae. It was described by White in 1858. It is known from Thailand and India.
