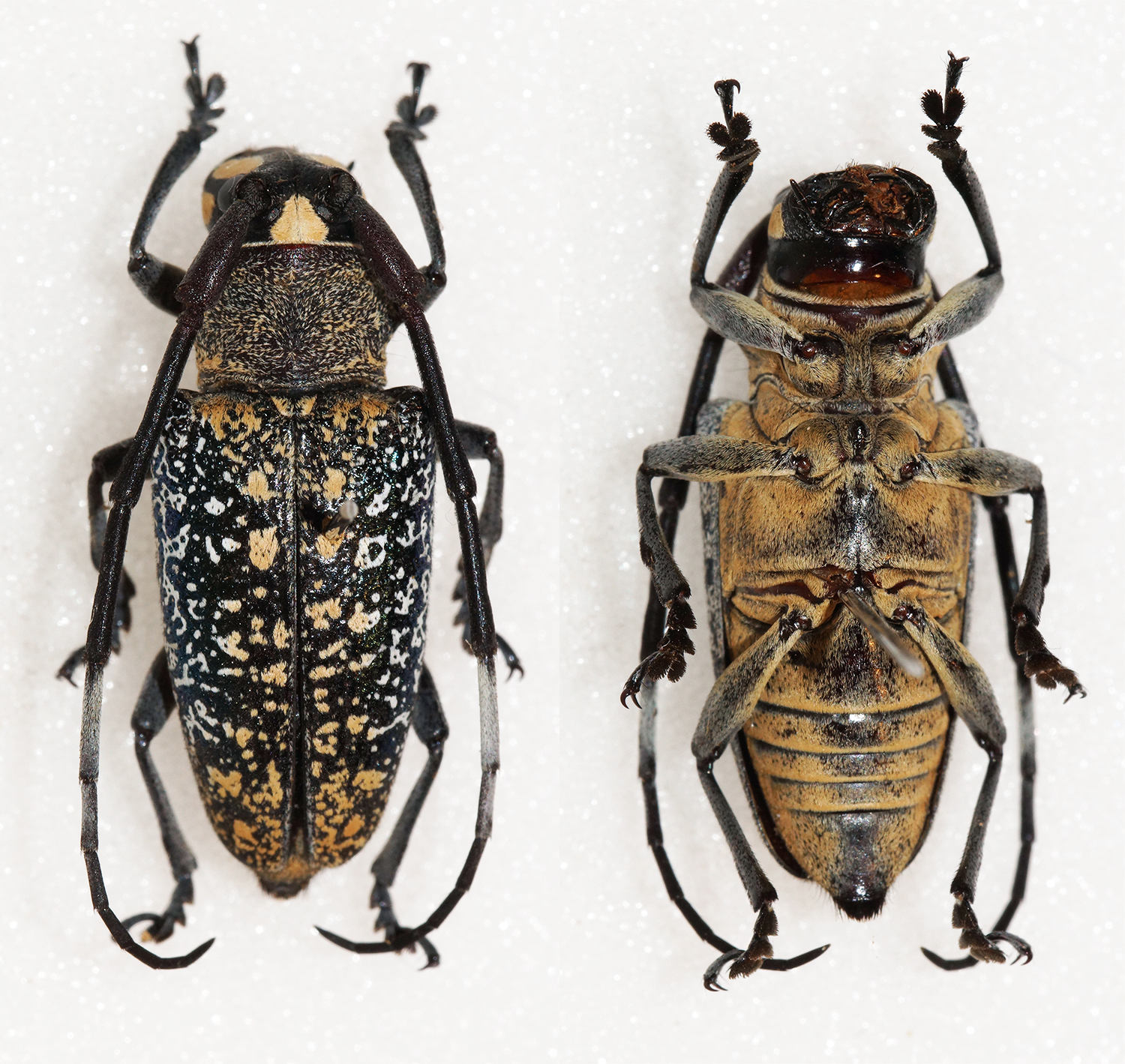
- Peribasis pubicollis

Scientific classification
- Domain: Eukaryota
- Kingdom: Animalia
- Phylum: Arthropoda
- Class: Insecta
- Order: Coleoptera
- Suborder: Polyphaga
- Infraorder: Cucujiformia
- Family: Cerambycidae
- Tribe: Lamiini
- Genus: Peribasis

= Peribasis =

Genus of beetles

Peribasis is a genus of longhorn beetles of the subfamily Lamiinae, containing the following species:

- Peribasis helenor (Newman, 1851)
- Peribasis larvata (White, 1858)
- Peribasis pubicollis Pascoe, 1866
