= Diallus guttatus =

Scientific classification
- Kingdom: Animalia
- Phylum: Arthropoda
- Class: Insecta
- Order: Coleoptera
- Suborder: Polyphaga
- Infraorder: Cucujiformia
- Family: Cerambycidae
- Genus: Diallus
- Species: D. guttatus

Binomial name
- Diallus guttatus Pascoe, 1885

Species of beetle

Diallus guttatus is a species of beetle in the family Cerambycidae. It was described by Francis Polkinghorne Pascoe in 1885. It is known from Moluccas.
