= Diallus gebehensis =

Scientific classification
- Kingdom: Animalia
- Phylum: Arthropoda
- Class: Insecta
- Order: Coleoptera
- Suborder: Polyphaga
- Infraorder: Cucujiformia
- Family: Cerambycidae
- Genus: Diallus
- Species: D. gebehensis

Binomial name
- Diallus gebehensis Breuning, 1957

Species of beetle

Diallus gebehensis is a species of beetle in the family Cerambycidae. It was described by Stephan von Breuning in 1957. It is known from Moluccas.
