= Diallus multiguttatus =

Scientific classification
- Kingdom: Animalia
- Phylum: Arthropoda
- Clade: Pancrustacea
- Class: Insecta
- Order: Coleoptera
- Suborder: Polyphaga
- Infraorder: Cucujiformia
- Family: Cerambycidae
- Genus: Diallus
- Species: D. multiguttatus

Binomial name
- Diallus multiguttatus Breuning, 1947

Species of beetle

Diallus multiguttatus is a species of beetle in the family Cerambycidae. It was described by Stephan von Breuning in 1947. It is known from Sulawesi.
