= Diallus papuensis =

Scientific classification
- Kingdom: Animalia
- Phylum: Arthropoda
- Class: Insecta
- Order: Coleoptera
- Suborder: Polyphaga
- Infraorder: Cucujiformia
- Family: Cerambycidae
- Genus: Diallus
- Species: D. papuensis

Binomial name
- Diallus papuensis Breuning, 1960

Species of beetle

Diallus papuensis is a species of beetle in the family Cerambycidae. It was described by Stephan von Breuning in 1960. It is known from Papua New Guinea.
