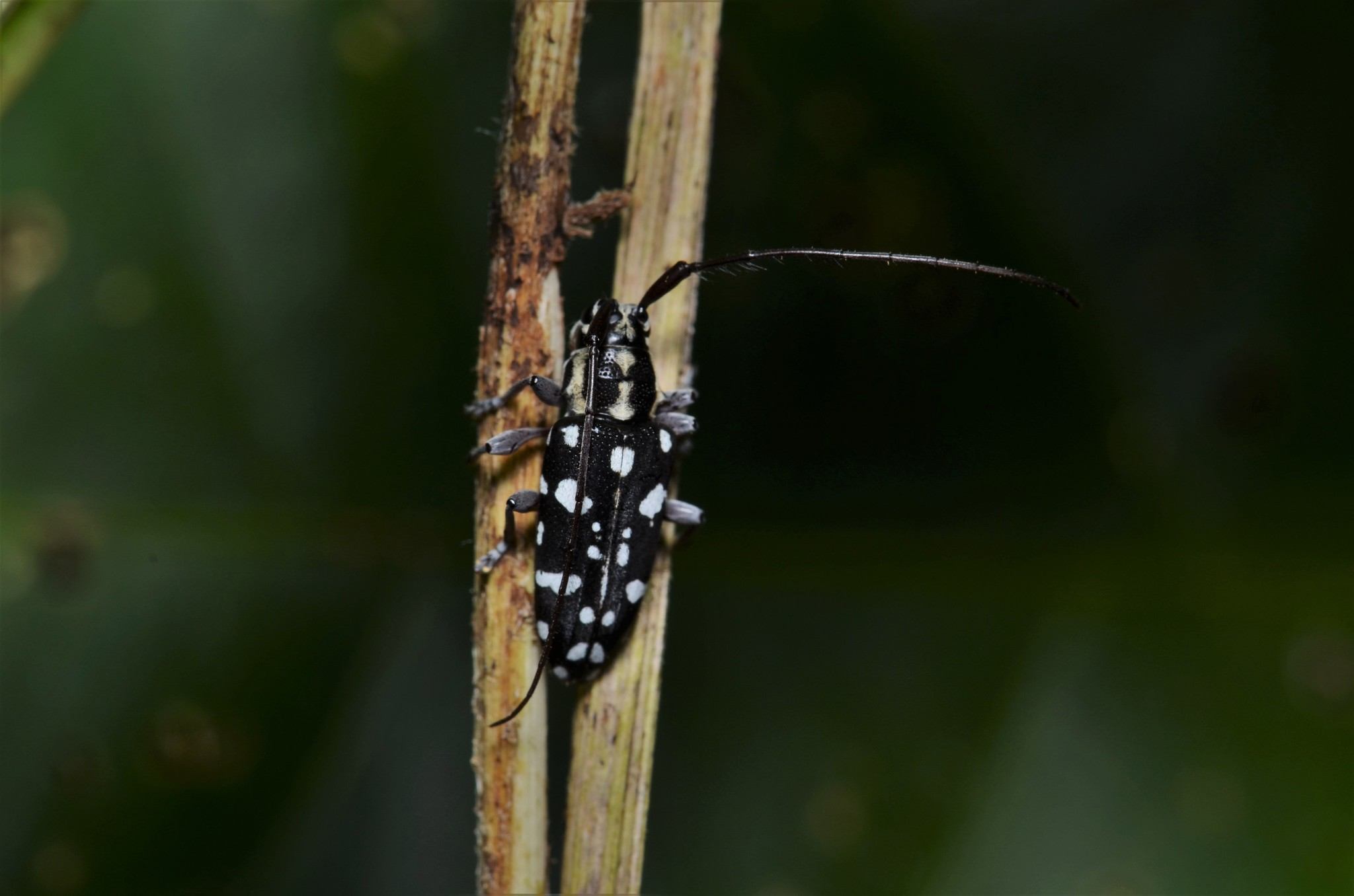

Scientific classification
- Kingdom: Animalia
- Phylum: Arthropoda
- Clade: Pancrustacea
- Class: Insecta
- Order: Coleoptera
- Suborder: Polyphaga
- Infraorder: Cucujiformia
- Family: Cerambycidae
- Tribe: Lamiini
- Genus: Diallus; Pascoe, 1866

Species
- See text

= Diallus =

Genus of beetles

Diallus is a genus of longhorn beetles that belongs to the subfamily Lamiinae (flat-faced longhorn beetles).

== Taxonomy ==
=== Species ===
The genus contains numerous species that are divided into two subgenera. They are listed below:

==== Diallus ====
- Diallus gebehensis Breuning, 1957
- Diallus guttatus Pascoe, 1885
- Diallus lachrymosus Pascoe, 1866
- Diallus lugens Pascoe, 1866
- Diallus multiguttatus Breuning, 1947
- Diallus papuensis Breuning, 1960
- Diallus subtinctus Pascoe, 1866

==== Trichodiallus ====
- Diallus papuanus Breuning, 1947
- Diallus quadrimaculatus Breuning, 1942
