= Diallus lachrymosus =

Scientific classification
- Kingdom: Animalia
- Phylum: Arthropoda
- Clade: Pancrustacea
- Class: Insecta
- Order: Coleoptera
- Suborder: Polyphaga
- Infraorder: Cucujiformia
- Family: Cerambycidae
- Genus: Diallus
- Species: D. lachrymosus

Binomial name
- Diallus lachrymosus Pascoe, 1866

Species of beetle

Diallus lachrymosus is a species of beetle belonging to the family Cerambycidae. It was described by Francis Polkinghorne Pascoe in 1866. It is known from Sulawesi.
