= Mimothestus atricornis =

Scientific classification
- Kingdom: Animalia
- Phylum: Arthropoda
- Class: Insecta
- Order: Coleoptera
- Suborder: Polyphaga
- Infraorder: Cucujiformia
- Family: Cerambycidae
- Genus: Mimothestus
- Species: M. atricornis

Binomial name
- Mimothestus atricornis Pu, 1999

Synonyms
- Mimothetus atricornis Pu, 1999 (misspelling)

Species of beetle

Mimothestus atricornis is a species of beetle in the family Cerambycidae. It was described by Pu in 1999. It is known from China.
