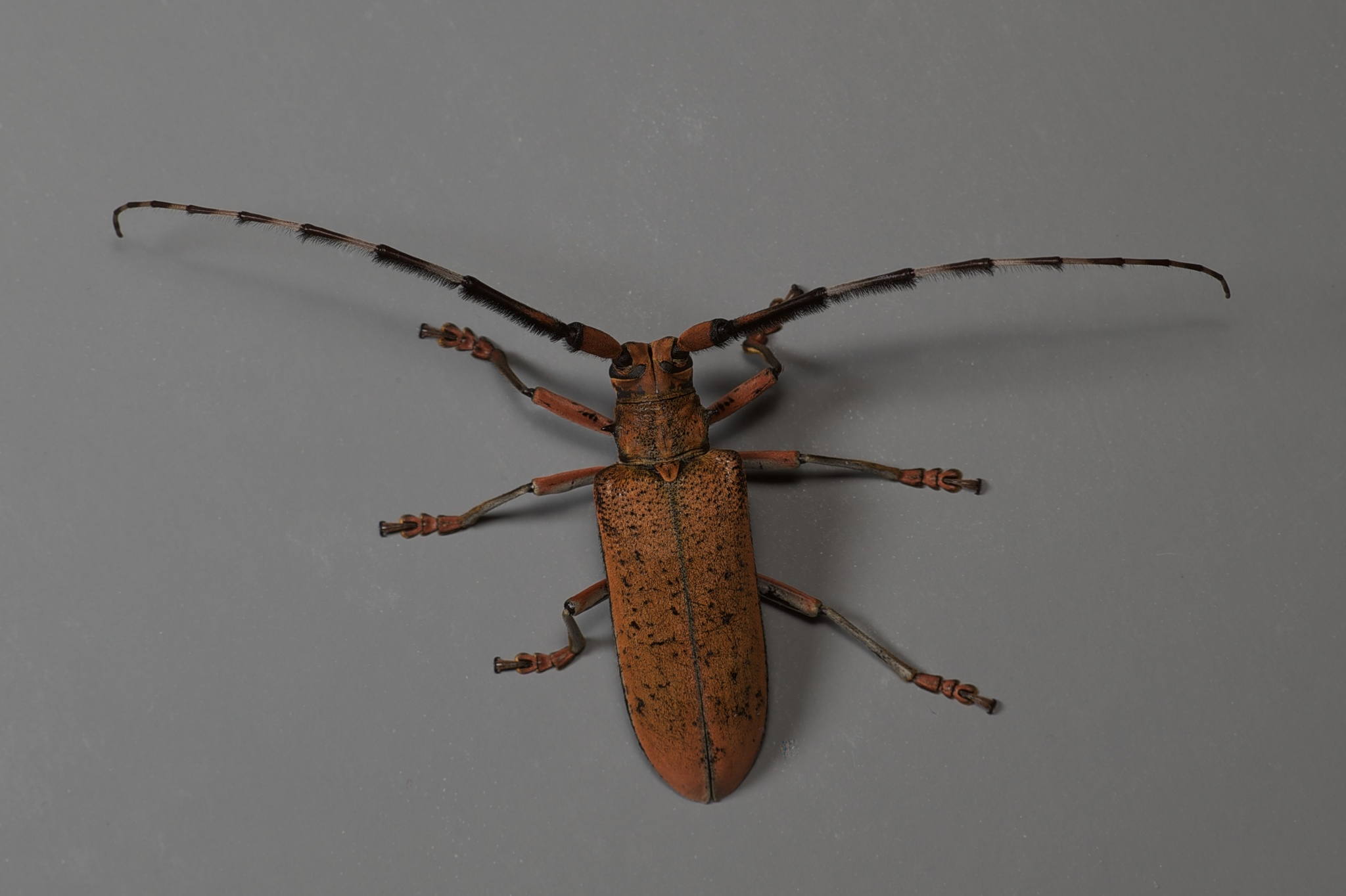

Scientific classification
- Kingdom: Animalia
- Phylum: Arthropoda
- Class: Insecta
- Order: Coleoptera
- Suborder: Polyphaga
- Infraorder: Cucujiformia
- Family: Cerambycidae
- Genus: Mimothestus
- Species: M. annulicornis

Binomial name
- Mimothestus annulicornis Pic, 1935

= Mimothestus annulicornis =

Species of beetle

Mimothestus annulicornis is a species of beetle in the family Cerambycidae. It was described by Maurice Pic in 1935. It feeds on Cinnamomum camphora.
