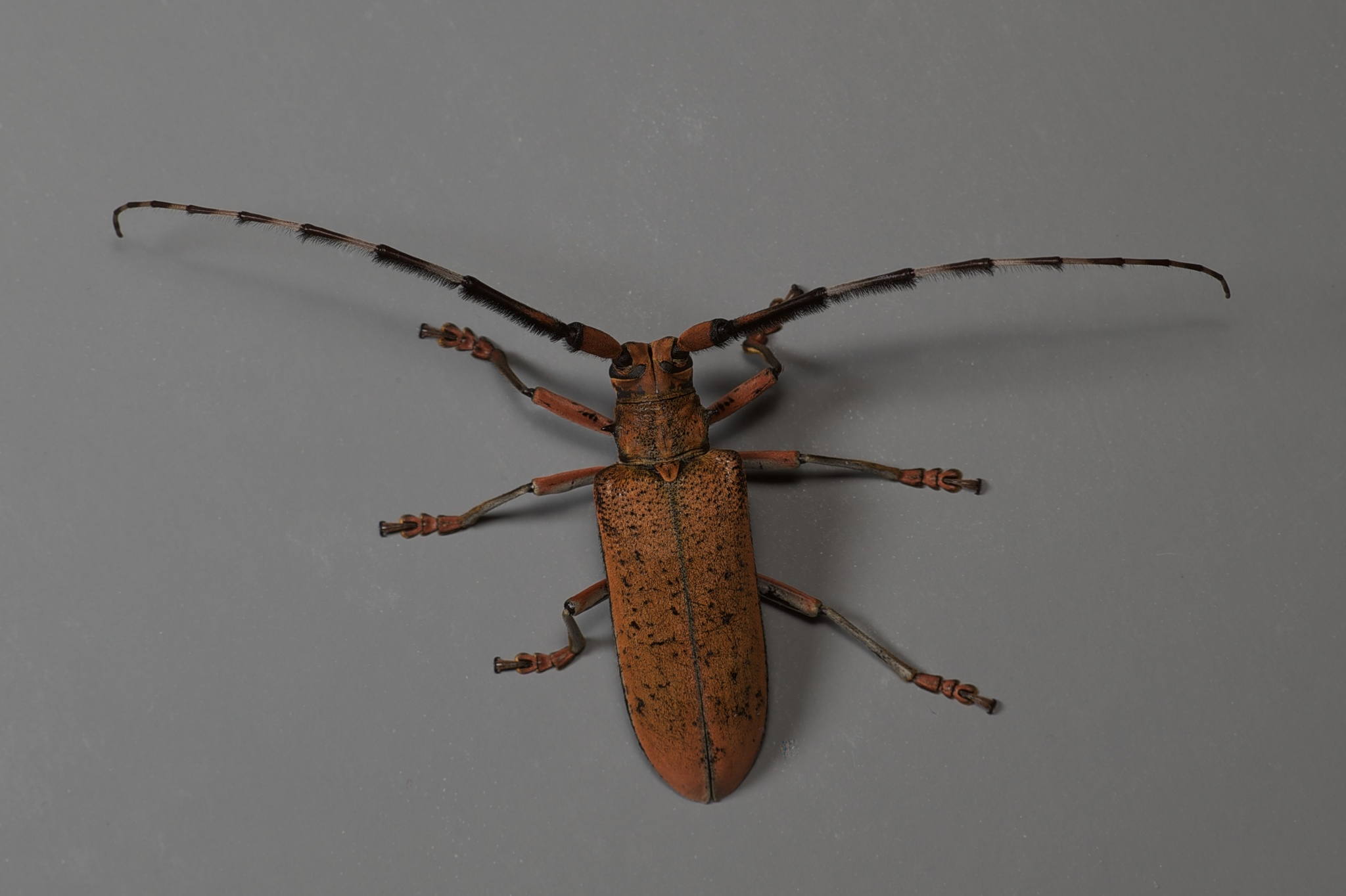
- Mimothestus annulicornis

Scientific classification
- Kingdom: Animalia
- Phylum: Arthropoda
- Class: Insecta
- Order: Coleoptera
- Suborder: Polyphaga
- Infraorder: Cucujiformia
- Family: Cerambycidae
- Tribe: Lamiini
- Genus: Mimothestus

= Mimothestus =

Genus of beetles

Mimothestus is a genus of longhorn beetles of the subfamily Lamiinae, containing the following species:

- Mimothestus annulicornis Pic, 1935
- Mimothestus atricornis Pu, 1999
