= Pseuduraecha punctiventris =

Scientific classification
- Kingdom: Animalia
- Phylum: Arthropoda
- Class: Insecta
- Order: Coleoptera
- Suborder: Polyphaga
- Infraorder: Cucujiformia
- Family: Cerambycidae
- Genus: Pseuduraecha
- Species: P. punctiventris

Binomial name
- Pseuduraecha punctiventris (Heller, 1926)

Species of beetle

Pseuduraecha punctiventris is a species of beetle in the family Cerambycidae. It was described by Heller in 1926.
