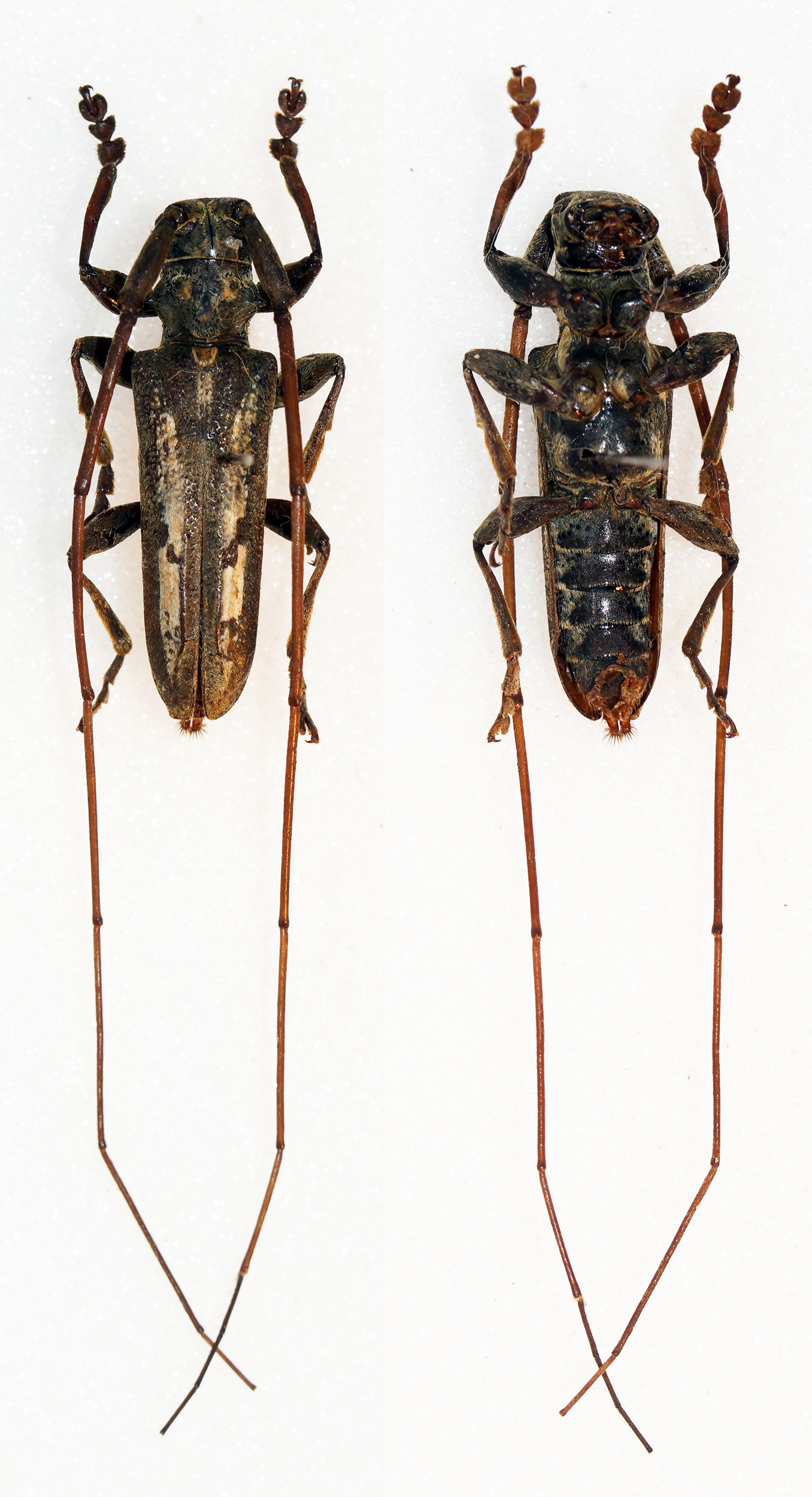
- Sex: Male

Scientific classification
- Kingdom: Animalia
- Phylum: Arthropoda
- Class: Insecta
- Order: Coleoptera
- Suborder: Polyphaga
- Infraorder: Cucujiformia
- Family: Cerambycidae
- Tribe: Lamiini
- Genus: Pseuduraecha

= Pseuduraecha =

Genus of beetles

Pseuduraecha is a genus of longhorn beetles of the subfamily Lamiinae, containing the following species:

- Pseuduraecha punctiventris (Heller, 1926)
- Pseuduraecha sulcaticeps Pic, 1925
