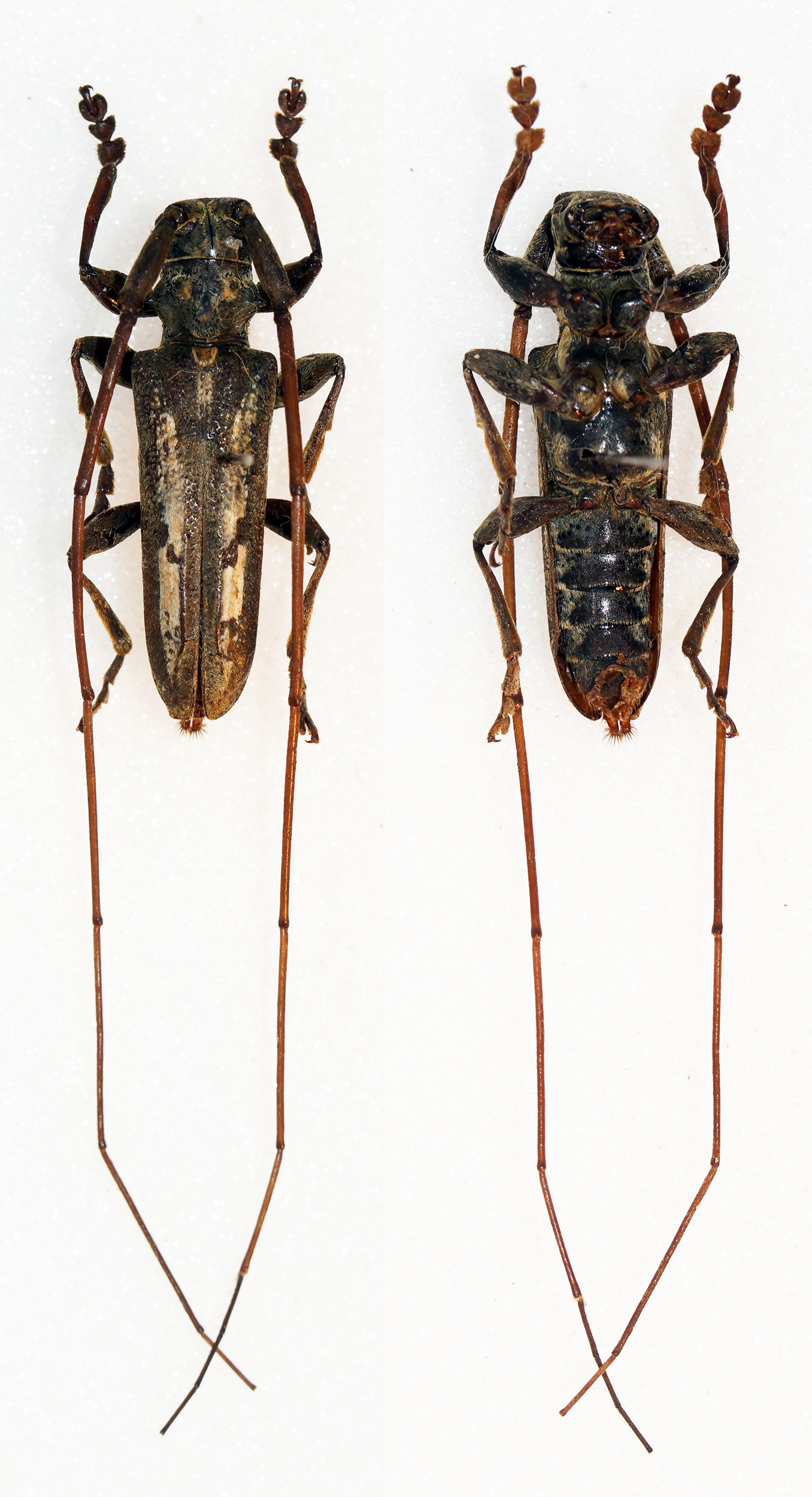

Scientific classification
- Kingdom: Animalia
- Phylum: Arthropoda
- Class: Insecta
- Order: Coleoptera
- Suborder: Polyphaga
- Infraorder: Cucujiformia
- Family: Cerambycidae
- Genus: Pseuduraecha
- Species: P. sulcaticeps

Binomial name
- Pseuduraecha sulcaticeps Pic, 1925

= Pseuduraecha sulcaticeps =

Species of beetle

Pseuduraecha sulcaticeps is a species of beetle in the family Cerambycidae. It was described by Maurice Pic in 1925.
