= Pseudopsacothea =

Scientific classification
- Kingdom: Animalia
- Phylum: Arthropoda
- Class: Insecta
- Order: Coleoptera
- Suborder: Polyphaga
- Infraorder: Cucujiformia
- Family: Cerambycidae
- Subfamily: Lamiinae
- Tribe: Lamiini
- Genus: Pseudopsacothea; Pic, 1935

Genus of beetles

Pseudopsacothea is a genus of longhorn beetles of the subfamily Lamiinae, containing the following species:

- Pseudopsacothea albonotata Pic, 1935
- Pseudopsacothea modiglianii Breuning, 1970
