= Pseudopsacothea albonotata =

Scientific classification
- Kingdom: Animalia
- Phylum: Arthropoda
- Class: Insecta
- Order: Coleoptera
- Suborder: Polyphaga
- Infraorder: Cucujiformia
- Family: Cerambycidae
- Genus: Pseudonemophas
- Species: P. albonotata

Binomial name
- Pseudonemophas albonotata Pic, 1935

Species of beetle

Pseudopsacothea albonotata is a species of beetle in the family Cerambycidae. It was described by Maurice Pic in 1935.
