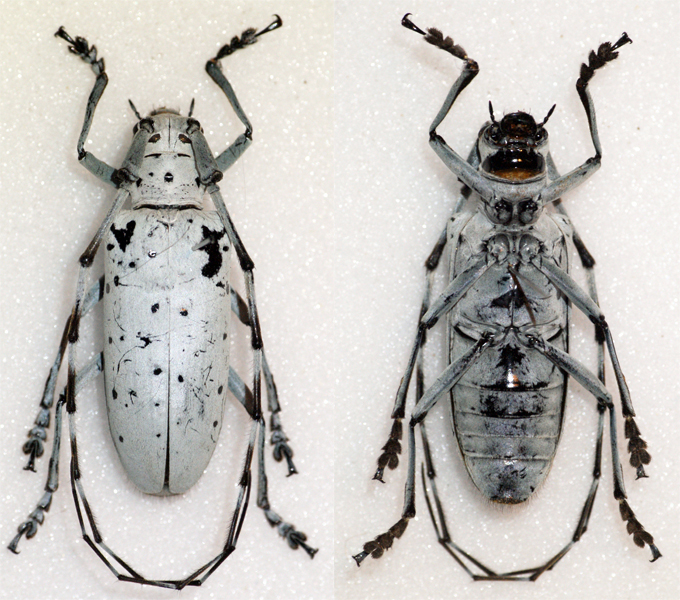
- Pseudonemophas versteegi

Scientific classification
- Domain: Eukaryota
- Kingdom: Animalia
- Phylum: Arthropoda
- Class: Insecta
- Order: Coleoptera
- Suborder: Polyphaga
- Infraorder: Cucujiformia
- Family: Cerambycidae
- Tribe: Lamiini
- Genus: Pseudonemophas
- Species: P. versteegi

Binomial name
- Pseudonemophas versteegi (Ritsema, 1881)

Synonyms
- Anoplophora versteegi (Ritsema, 1881); Monochamus versteegi Ritsema, 1881

= Pseudonemophas versteegi =

Species of beetle

Pseudonemophas versteegi is a species of beetle in the family Cerambycidae. It was described by Ritsema in 1881, originally under the genus Monochamus. It is known from India, Sumatra, Myanmar, Laos, Thailand, Malaysia, Vietnam, and China. It contains the varietas Pseudonemophas versteegi var. albescens.
