= Pseudonemophas baluanus =

Scientific classification
- Kingdom: Animalia
- Phylum: Arthropoda
- Class: Insecta
- Order: Coleoptera
- Suborder: Polyphaga
- Infraorder: Cucujiformia
- Family: Cerambycidae
- Genus: Pseudonemophas
- Species: P. baluanus

Binomial name
- Pseudonemophas baluanus (Aurivillius, 1923)

Synonyms
- Monochamus baluanus Aurivillius, 1923

Species of beetle

Pseudonemophas baluanus is a species of beetle in the family Cerambycidae. It was described by Per Olof Christopher Aurivillius in 1923. It is known from Borneo and Malaysia.
