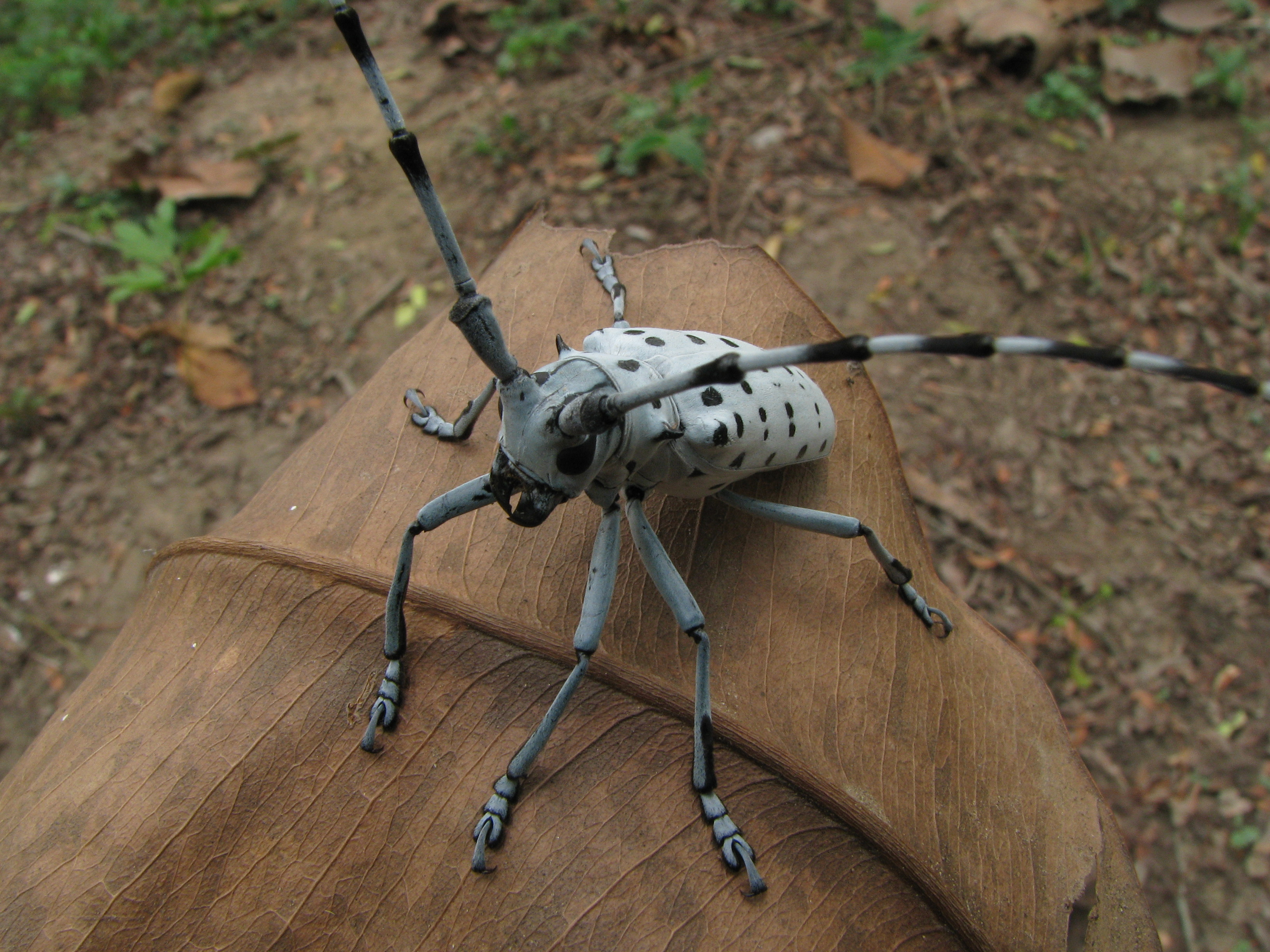
- Pseudonemophas versteegi

Scientific classification
- Kingdom: Animalia
- Phylum: Arthropoda
- Class: Insecta
- Order: Coleoptera
- Suborder: Polyphaga
- Infraorder: Cucujiformia
- Family: Cerambycidae
- Subfamily: Lamiinae
- Tribe: Lamiini
- Genus: Pseudonemophas; Breuning, 1944

= Pseudonemophas =

Genus of beetles

Pseudonemophas is a genus of longhorn beetles of the subfamily Lamiinae, containing the following species:

- Pseudonemophas baluanus (Aurivillius, 1923)
- Pseudonemophas versteegi (Ritsema, 1881)
