= Sternohammus femoralis =

Scientific classification
- Kingdom: Animalia
- Phylum: Arthropoda
- Class: Insecta
- Order: Coleoptera
- Suborder: Polyphaga
- Infraorder: Cucujiformia
- Family: Cerambycidae
- Genus: Sternohammus
- Species: S. femoralis

Binomial name
- Sternohammus femoralis (Aurivillius, 1927)

Synonyms
- Dihammus femoralis Aurivillius, 1927

Species of beetle

Sternohammus femoralis is a species of beetle in the family Cerambycidae. It was described by Per Olof Christopher Aurivillius in 1927. It is known from Philippines.
