= Sternohammus =

Scientific classification
- Kingdom: Animalia
- Phylum: Arthropoda
- Class: Insecta
- Order: Coleoptera
- Suborder: Polyphaga
- Infraorder: Cucujiformia
- Family: Cerambycidae
- Tribe: Lamiini
- Genus: Sternohammus; Breuning, 1935

Genus of beetles

Sternohammus is a genus of longhorn beetles of the subfamily Lamiinae, containing the following species:

- Sternohammus assamensis Breuning, 1966
- Sternohammus atricornis Breuning, 1935
- Sternohammus celebensis Breuning, 1935
- Sternohammus femoralis (Aurivillius, 1927)
- Sternohammus femoraloides Breuning, 1980
- Sternohammus laosensis Breuning, 1963
- Sternohammus niasensis Breuning, 1935
- Sternohammus sericeus (Breuning, 1938)
- Sternohammus strandi Breuning, 1935
- Sternohammus sumatranus Breuning, 1935
- Sternohammus yunnanus Wang & Jiang, 1998
