= Sternohammus sericeus =

Scientific classification
- Kingdom: Animalia
- Phylum: Arthropoda
- Class: Insecta
- Order: Coleoptera
- Suborder: Polyphaga
- Infraorder: Cucujiformia
- Family: Cerambycidae
- Genus: Sternohammus
- Species: S. sericeus

Binomial name
- Sternohammus sericeus (Breuning, 1938)

Species of beetle

Sternohammus sericeus is a species of beetle in the family Cerambycidae. It was described by Stephan von Breuning in 1938.
