= Sternohammus strandi =

Scientific classification
- Kingdom: Animalia
- Phylum: Arthropoda
- Clade: Pancrustacea
- Class: Insecta
- Order: Coleoptera
- Suborder: Polyphaga
- Infraorder: Cucujiformia
- Family: Cerambycidae
- Genus: Sternohammus
- Species: S. strandi

Binomial name
- Sternohammus strandi Breuning, 1935

Species of beetle

Sternohammus strandi is a species of beetle in the family Cerambycidae. It was described by Stephan von Breuning in 1935. It is known from Java.
