= Sternohammus yunnanus =

Scientific classification
- Kingdom: Animalia
- Phylum: Arthropoda
- Class: Insecta
- Order: Coleoptera
- Suborder: Polyphaga
- Infraorder: Cucujiformia
- Family: Cerambycidae
- Genus: Sternohammus
- Species: S. yunnanus

Binomial name
- Sternohammus yunnanus Wang & Jiang, 1998

Synonyms
- Sternohammus yunnana Wang & Jiang, 1998

Species of beetle

Sternohammus yunnanus is a species of beetle in the family Cerambycidae. It was described by Wang and Jiang in 1998, originally under the genus Sternohammus. It is known from China.
