= Xenohammus =

Scientific classification
- Domain: Eukaryota
- Kingdom: Animalia
- Phylum: Arthropoda
- Class: Insecta
- Order: Coleoptera
- Suborder: Polyphaga
- Infraorder: Cucujiformia
- Family: Cerambycidae
- Tribe: Lamiini
- Genus: Xenohammus

Genus of beetles

Xenohammus is a genus of longhorn beetles of the subfamily Lamiinae, containing the following species:

- Xenohammus albomaculatus Wang & Chiang, 2000
- Xenohammus assamensis (Breuning, 1935)
- Xenohammus bimaculatus Schwarzer, 1931
- Xenohammus flavoguttatus Pu, 1999
- Xenohammus griseomarmoratus Breuning, 1956
- Xenohammus lumawigi Breuning, 1980
- Xenohammus nebulosus Schwarzer, 1931
- Xenohammus nigromaculatus (Pic, 1926)
- Xenohammus quadriplagiatus Breuning, 1938
