= Xenohammus bimaculatus =

Scientific classification
- Domain: Eukaryota
- Kingdom: Animalia
- Phylum: Arthropoda
- Class: Insecta
- Order: Coleoptera
- Suborder: Polyphaga
- Infraorder: Cucujiformia
- Family: Cerambycidae
- Tribe: Lamiini
- Genus: Xenohammus
- Species: X. bimaculatus

Binomial name
- Xenohammus bimaculatus Schwarzer, 1931

Synonyms
- Monochammus filicornis Gressitt, 1935

Species of beetle

Xenohammus bimaculatus is a species of beetle in the family Cerambycidae. It was described by Bernhard Schwarzer in 1931. It is known from Taiwan, China and Japan.
