= Xenohammus griseomarmoratus =

Scientific classification
- Kingdom: Animalia
- Phylum: Arthropoda
- Class: Insecta
- Order: Coleoptera
- Suborder: Polyphaga
- Infraorder: Cucujiformia
- Family: Cerambycidae
- Genus: Xenohammus
- Species: X. griseomarmoratus

Binomial name
- Xenohammus griseomarmoratus Breuning, 1956

Species of beetle

Xenohammus griseomarmoratus is a species of beetle in the family Cerambycidae. It was described by Stephan von Breuning in 1956. It is known from China.
