= Xenohammus flavoguttatus =

Scientific classification
- Domain: Eukaryota
- Kingdom: Animalia
- Phylum: Arthropoda
- Class: Insecta
- Order: Coleoptera
- Suborder: Polyphaga
- Infraorder: Cucujiformia
- Family: Cerambycidae
- Tribe: Lamiini
- Genus: Xenohammus
- Species: X. flavoguttatus

Binomial name
- Xenohammus flavoguttatus Pu, 1999

Species of beetle

Xenohammus flavoguttatus is a species of beetle in the family Cerambycidae. It was described by Pu in 1999. It is known from China.
