= Xenohammus assamensis =

Scientific classification
- Kingdom: Animalia
- Phylum: Arthropoda
- Class: Insecta
- Order: Coleoptera
- Suborder: Polyphaga
- Infraorder: Cucujiformia
- Family: Cerambycidae
- Genus: Xenohammus
- Species: X. assamensis

Binomial name
- Xenohammus assamensis (Breuning, 1935)

Synonyms
- Paramonochamus assamensis Breuning, 1935

Species of beetle

Xenohammus assamensis is a species of beetle in the family Cerambycidae. It was described by Stephan von Breuning in 1935. It is known from India.
