= Xenohammus nigromaculatus =

Scientific classification
- Kingdom: Animalia
- Phylum: Arthropoda
- Class: Insecta
- Order: Coleoptera
- Suborder: Polyphaga
- Infraorder: Cucujiformia
- Family: Cerambycidae
- Genus: Xenohammus
- Species: X. nigromaculatus

Binomial name
- Xenohammus nigromaculatus (Pic, 1926)

Species of beetle

Xenohammus nigromaculatus is a species of beetle in the family Cerambycidae. It was described by Maurice Pic in 1926. It is known from Vietnam.
