= Xenohammus nebulosus =

Scientific classification
- Domain: Eukaryota
- Kingdom: Animalia
- Phylum: Arthropoda
- Class: Insecta
- Order: Coleoptera
- Suborder: Polyphaga
- Infraorder: Cucujiformia
- Family: Cerambycidae
- Tribe: Lamiini
- Genus: Xenohammus
- Species: X. nebulosus

Binomial name
- Xenohammus nebulosus Schwarzer, 1931

Species of beetle

Xenohammus nebulosus is a species of beetle in the family Cerambycidae. It was described by Bernhard Schwarzer in 1931. It is known from Taiwan.
