= Xenohammus albomaculatus =

Scientific classification
- Domain: Eukaryota
- Kingdom: Animalia
- Phylum: Arthropoda
- Class: Insecta
- Order: Coleoptera
- Suborder: Polyphaga
- Infraorder: Cucujiformia
- Family: Cerambycidae
- Tribe: Lamiini
- Genus: Xenohammus
- Species: X. albomaculatus

Binomial name
- Xenohammus albomaculatus Wang & Chiang, 2000

Species of beetle

Xenohammus albomaculatus is a species of beetle in the family Cerambycidae. It was described by Wang and Chiang in 2000. It is known from China.
