= Domitia lupanaria =

Scientific classification
- Domain: Eukaryota
- Kingdom: Animalia
- Phylum: Arthropoda
- Class: Insecta
- Order: Coleoptera
- Suborder: Polyphaga
- Infraorder: Cucujiformia
- Family: Cerambycidae
- Subfamily: Lamiinae
- Tribe: Monochamini
- Genus: Domitia
- Species: D. lupanaria

Binomial name
- Domitia lupanaria Thomson, 1858

Species of beetle

Domitia lupanaria is a species of flat-faced longhorns in the beetle family Cerambycidae. It is found in Gabon.

This species was described by James Thomson in 1858.
