= Domitia bomansi =

Scientific classification
- Kingdom: Animalia
- Phylum: Arthropoda
- Class: Insecta
- Order: Coleoptera
- Suborder: Polyphaga
- Infraorder: Cucujiformia
- Family: Cerambycidae
- Subfamily: Lamiinae
- Tribe: Monochamini
- Genus: Domitia
- Species: D. bomansi

Binomial name
- Domitia bomansi Breuning, 1965

Species of beetle

Domitia bomansi is a species of flat-faced longhorns in the beetle family Cerambycidae. It is found in DR Congo.
