= Domitia (beetle) =

Scientific classification
- Domain: Eukaryota
- Kingdom: Animalia
- Phylum: Arthropoda
- Class: Insecta
- Order: Coleoptera
- Suborder: Polyphaga
- Infraorder: Cucujiformia
- Family: Cerambycidae
- Subfamily: Lamiinae
- Tribe: Monochamini
- Genus: Domitia; Thomson, 1858

Genus of beetles

Domitia is a genus of Long-Horned Beetles in the beetle family Cerambycidae. There are about seven described species in Domitia, found in Sub-Saharan Africa.

== Species ==
These seven species belong to the genus Domitia:

- Domitia aenea (Parry, 1849) (Ghana, Guinea, Ivory Coast)
- Domitia basilewskyi Breuning, 1955 (Rwanda)
- Domitia bomansi Breuning, 1965 (DR Congo)
- Domitia cervina Hintz, 1913 (Sub-Saharan Africa)
- Domitia lupanaria Thomson, 1858 (Gabon)
- Domitia marshalli Breuning, 1935 (Sub-Saharan Africa)
- Domitia viridipennis (Chevrolat, 1855) (Cameroon, Nigeria)
