= Domitia viridipennis =

Scientific classification
- Domain: Eukaryota
- Kingdom: Animalia
- Phylum: Arthropoda
- Class: Insecta
- Order: Coleoptera
- Suborder: Polyphaga
- Infraorder: Cucujiformia
- Family: Cerambycidae
- Subfamily: Lamiinae
- Tribe: Monochamini
- Genus: Domitia
- Species: D. viridipennis

Binomial name
- Domitia viridipennis (Chevrolat, 1855)

Synonyms
- Monohammus viridipennis Chevrolat, 1855

Species of beetle

Domitia viridipennis is a species of flat-faced longhorns in the beetle family Cerambycidae. It is found in Cameroon and Nigeria.

This species was described by Chevrolat in 1855, originally under the genus Monohammus.
