= Domitia cervina =

Scientific classification
- Kingdom: Animalia
- Phylum: Arthropoda
- Class: Insecta
- Order: Coleoptera
- Suborder: Polyphaga
- Infraorder: Cucujiformia
- Family: Cerambycidae
- Subfamily: Lamiinae
- Tribe: Monochamini
- Genus: Domitia
- Species: D. cervina

Binomial name
- Domitia cervina Hintz, 1913

Species of beetle

Domitia cervina is a species of flat-faced longhorns in the beetle family Cerambycidae. It is found in Angola, DR Congo, Gabon, Central African Republic, and Republic of the Congo.
