= Domitia aenea =

Scientific classification
- Domain: Eukaryota
- Kingdom: Animalia
- Phylum: Arthropoda
- Class: Insecta
- Order: Coleoptera
- Suborder: Polyphaga
- Infraorder: Cucujiformia
- Family: Cerambycidae
- Subfamily: Lamiinae
- Tribe: Monochamini
- Genus: Domitia
- Species: D. aenea

Binomial name
- Domitia aenea (Parry, 1849)

Synonyms
- Domitia aenea tomentosa Lepesme & Breuning, 1952; Lamia aenea Parry, 1849

Species of beetle

Domitia aenea is a species of long-horned beetle in the family Cerambycidae. It is found in Ghana, Guinea, and Ivory Coast.

This species was described by Parry in 1849, originally under the genus Lamia.
