= Domitia marshalli =

Scientific classification
- Kingdom: Animalia
- Phylum: Arthropoda
- Class: Insecta
- Order: Coleoptera
- Suborder: Polyphaga
- Infraorder: Cucujiformia
- Family: Cerambycidae
- Subfamily: Lamiinae
- Tribe: Monochamini
- Genus: Domitia
- Species: D. marshalli

Binomial name
- Domitia marshalli Breuning, 1935

Species of beetle

Domitia marshalli is a species of flat-faced longhorns in the beetle family Cerambycidae. It is found in the Central African Republic, Republic of the Congo, Cameroon, and DR Congo.

This species was described by Stephan von Breuning in 1935.
