= Lamiomimus =

Scientific classification
- Domain: Eukaryota
- Kingdom: Animalia
- Phylum: Arthropoda
- Class: Insecta
- Order: Coleoptera
- Suborder: Polyphaga
- Infraorder: Cucujiformia
- Family: Cerambycidae
- Tribe: Lamiini
- Genus: Lamiomimus

Genus of beetles

Lamiomimus is a genus of longhorn beetles of the subfamily Lamiinae, containing the following species:

- Lamiomimus chinensis Breuning, 1936
- Lamiomimus gottschei Kolbe, 1886
