= Lamiomimus gottschei =

Scientific classification
- Domain: Eukaryota
- Kingdom: Animalia
- Phylum: Arthropoda
- Class: Insecta
- Order: Coleoptera
- Suborder: Polyphaga
- Infraorder: Cucujiformia
- Family: Cerambycidae
- Tribe: Lamiini
- Genus: Lamiomimus
- Species: L. gottschei

Binomial name
- Lamiomimus gottschei Kolbe, 1886

Synonyms
- Lamia adelpha Ganglabauer, 1887

Species of beetle

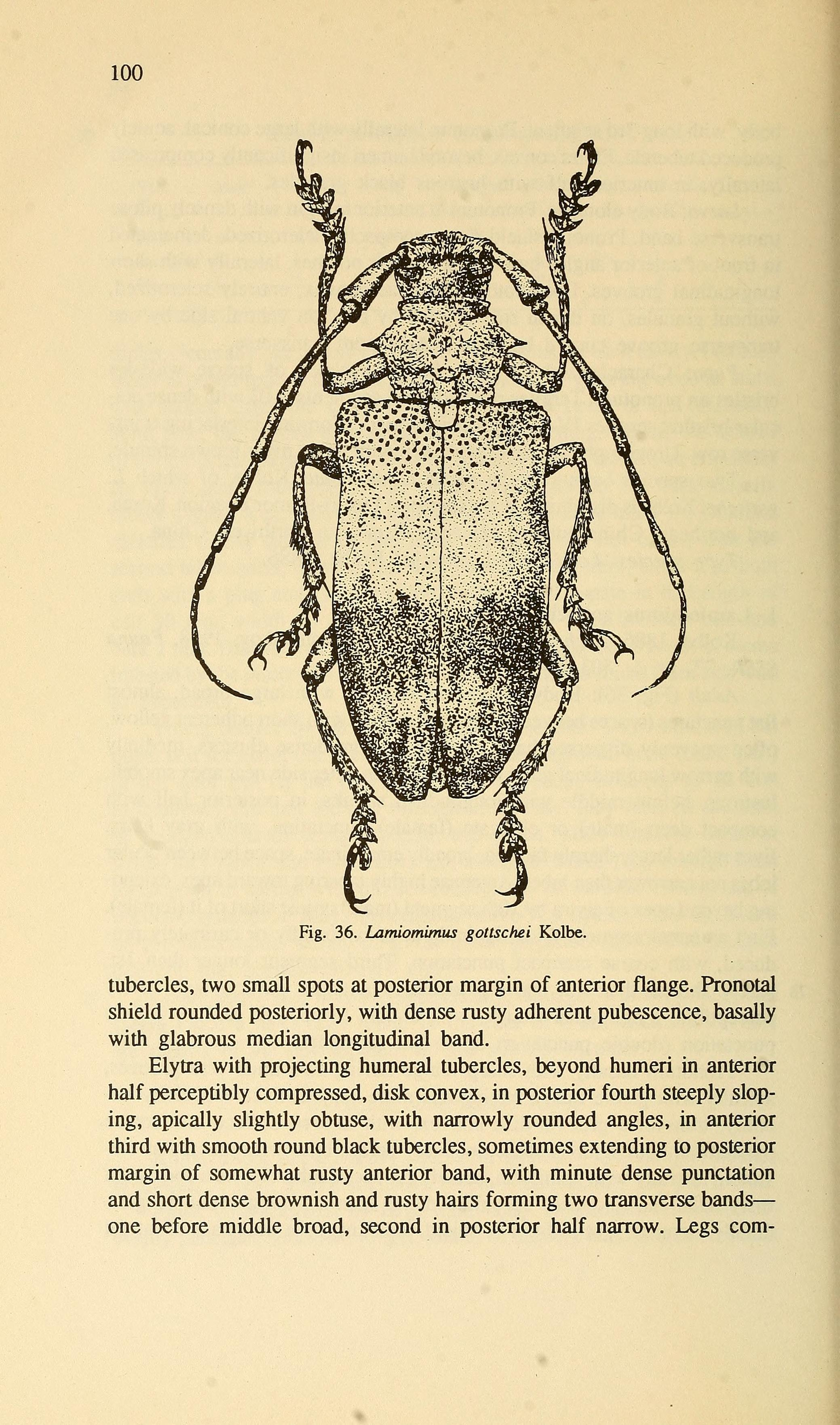

Lamiomimus gottschei is a species of beetle in the family Cerambycidae. First described by Kolbe in 1886. It is known to occur in Russia, North Korea, and China.
