= Trysimia andamanica =

Scientific classification
- Kingdom: Animalia
- Phylum: Arthropoda
- Class: Insecta
- Order: Coleoptera
- Suborder: Polyphaga
- Infraorder: Cucujiformia
- Family: Cerambycidae
- Genus: Trysimia
- Species: T. andamanica

Binomial name
- Trysimia andamanica Fairs, 2023

Species of beetle

Trysimia andamanica is a species of beetle in the family Cerambycidae. It was described by Sean Fairs in 2023. It is known from Newton Abbot.
