= Trysimia =

Scientific classification
- Kingdom: Animalia
- Phylum: Arthropoda
- Class: Insecta
- Order: Coleoptera
- Suborder: Polyphaga
- Infraorder: Cucujiformia
- Family: Cerambycidae
- Tribe: Lamiini
- Genus: Trysimia; Pascoe, 1866

Genus of beetles

Trysimia is a genus of longhorn beetles of the subfamily Lamiinae, containing the following species:

- Trysimia albomaculata (Schwarzer, 1924)
- Trysimia andamanica Breuning, 1948
- Trysimia geminata Pascoe, 1866
- Trysimia javanica Breuning, 1935
- Trysimia propinqua Breuning, 1959
- Trysimia rugicollis Pascoe, 1866
