= Trysimia rugicollis =

Scientific classification
- Kingdom: Animalia
- Phylum: Arthropoda
- Clade: Pancrustacea
- Class: Insecta
- Order: Coleoptera
- Suborder: Polyphaga
- Infraorder: Cucujiformia
- Family: Cerambycidae
- Genus: Trysimia
- Species: T. rugicollis

Binomial name
- Trysimia rugicollis Pascoe, 1866

Species of beetle

Trysimia rugicollis is a species of beetle in the family Cerambycidae. It was described by Francis Polkinghorne Pascoe in 1866. It is known from Sulawesi.
