= Trysimia albomaculata =

Scientific classification
- Kingdom: Animalia
- Phylum: Arthropoda
- Class: Insecta
- Order: Coleoptera
- Suborder: Polyphaga
- Infraorder: Cucujiformia
- Family: Cerambycidae
- Genus: Trysimia
- Species: T. albomaculata

Binomial name
- Trysimia albomaculata (Schwarzer, 1924)

Synonyms
- Pseudonephelotus albomaculatus Schwarzer, 1924

Species of beetle

Trysimia albomaculata is a species of beetle in the family Cerambycidae. It was described by Bernhard Schwarzer in 1924. It is known from Sumatra.
