= Trysimia propinqua =

Scientific classification
- Kingdom: Animalia
- Phylum: Arthropoda
- Class: Insecta
- Order: Coleoptera
- Suborder: Polyphaga
- Infraorder: Cucujiformia
- Family: Cerambycidae
- Genus: Trysimia
- Species: T. propinqua

Binomial name
- Trysimia propinqua Breuning, 1959

Species of beetle

Trysimia propinqua is a species of beetle in the family Cerambycidae. It was described by Stephan von Breuning in 1959. It is known from Moluccas.
