= Paruraecha =

Scientific classification
- Domain: Eukaryota
- Kingdom: Animalia
- Phylum: Arthropoda
- Class: Insecta
- Order: Coleoptera
- Suborder: Polyphaga
- Infraorder: Cucujiformia
- Family: Cerambycidae
- Tribe: Lamiini
- Genus: Paruraecha

Genus of beetles

Paruraecha is a genus of longhorn beetles of the subfamily Lamiinae, containing the following species:

subgenus Arisania

- Paruraecha acutipennis (Gressitt, 1942)
- Paruraecha submarmorata (Gressitt, 1936)

subgenus Paruraecha

- Paruraecha sikkimensis Breuning, 1938
- Paruraecha szetschuanica Breuning, 1935
