= Paruraecha acutipennis =

Scientific classification
- Domain: Eukaryota
- Kingdom: Animalia
- Phylum: Arthropoda
- Class: Insecta
- Order: Coleoptera
- Suborder: Polyphaga
- Infraorder: Cucujiformia
- Family: Cerambycidae
- Tribe: Lamiini
- Genus: Paruraecha
- Species: P. acutipennis

Binomial name
- Paruraecha acutipennis (Gressitt, 1942)

Synonyms
- Arisania acutipennis Gressitt, 1942

Species of beetle

Paruraecha acutipennis is a species of beetle in the family Cerambycidae. It was described by Gressitt in 1942.
