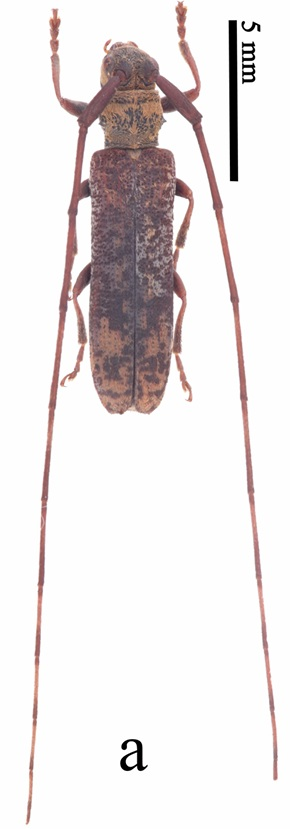

Scientific classification
- Domain: Eukaryota
- Kingdom: Animalia
- Phylum: Arthropoda
- Class: Insecta
- Order: Coleoptera
- Suborder: Polyphaga
- Infraorder: Cucujiformia
- Family: Cerambycidae
- Genus: Paruraecha
- Species: P. submarmorata

Binomial name
- Paruraecha submarmorata (Gressitt, 1936)

Synonyms
- Arisania submarmorata Gressitt, 1936

= Paruraecha submarmorata =

Species of beetle

Paruraecha submarmorata is a species of beetle in the family Cerambycidae. It was described by Gressitt in 1936. This species is found in China (Chongqing, Shaanxi, Zhejiang) and Taiwan.

Adults have a mostly black body, with the antennae, elytra and legs dark reddish-brown.
