= Oxyhammus scutellaris =

Scientific classification
- Kingdom: Animalia
- Phylum: Arthropoda
- Class: Insecta
- Order: Coleoptera
- Suborder: Polyphaga
- Infraorder: Cucujiformia
- Family: Cerambycidae
- Genus: Oxyhammus
- Species: O. scutellaris

Binomial name
- Oxyhammus scutellaris Kolbe, 1894

Synonyms
- Oxyhammus kolbei Breuning, 1961

Species of beetle

Oxyhammus scutellaris is a species of beetle in the family Cerambycidae. It was described by Kolbe in 1894.
