= Oxyhammus =

Scientific classification
- Kingdom: Animalia
- Phylum: Arthropoda
- Class: Insecta
- Order: Coleoptera
- Suborder: Polyphaga
- Infraorder: Cucujiformia
- Family: Cerambycidae
- Tribe: Lamiini
- Genus: Oxyhammus

Genus of beetles

Oxyhammus is a genus of longhorn beetles of the subfamily Lamiinae, containing the following species:

- Oxyhammus rubripes Breuning, 1978
- Oxyhammus scutellaris Kolbe, 1894
- Oxyhammus simplex Aurivillius, 1916
- Oxyhammus spinipennis Breuning, 1955
- Oxyhammus zanguebaricus Breuning, 1961
