= Oxyhammus simplex =

Scientific classification
- Kingdom: Animalia
- Phylum: Arthropoda
- Class: Insecta
- Order: Coleoptera
- Suborder: Polyphaga
- Infraorder: Cucujiformia
- Family: Cerambycidae
- Genus: Oxyhammus
- Species: O. simplex

Binomial name
- Oxyhammus simplex Aurivillius, 1916

Synonyms
- Ippitus simplex (Aurivillius, 1916)

Species of beetle

Oxyhammus simplex is a species of beetle in the family Cerambycidae. It was described by Per Olof Christopher Aurivillius in 1916.
