= Cornuscoparia =

Scientific classification
- Kingdom: Animalia
- Phylum: Arthropoda
- Class: Insecta
- Order: Coleoptera
- Suborder: Polyphaga
- Infraorder: Cucujiformia
- Family: Cerambycidae
- Tribe: Lamiini
- Genus: Cornuscoparia

Genus of beetles

Cornuscoparia is a genus of longhorn beetles of the subfamily Lamiinae, containing the following species:

- Cornuscoparia annulicornis (Heller, 1897)
- Cornuscoparia meeki Breuning, 1980
- Cornuscoparia ochracea Jordan, 1894
- Cornuscoparia schlaginhaufeni (Heller, 1910)
