= Cornuscoparia annulicornis =

Scientific classification
- Kingdom: Animalia
- Phylum: Arthropoda
- Class: Insecta
- Order: Coleoptera
- Suborder: Polyphaga
- Infraorder: Cucujiformia
- Family: Cerambycidae
- Genus: Cornuscoparia
- Species: C. annulicornis

Binomial name
- Cornuscoparia annulicornis (Heller, 1897)

Synonyms
- Jonthophana annulicornis Heller, 1897

Species of beetle

Cornuscoparia annulicornis is a species of beetle in the family Cerambycidae. It was described by Heller in 1897, originally under the genus Jonthophana. It is known from Papua New Guinea.

== Varietas ==
- Cornuscoparia annulicornis var. hirticornis (Heller, 1910)
- Cornuscoparia annulicornis var. wollastoni Gahan, 1915
