= Cornuscoparia ochracea =

Scientific classification
- Kingdom: Animalia
- Phylum: Arthropoda
- Class: Insecta
- Order: Coleoptera
- Suborder: Polyphaga
- Infraorder: Cucujiformia
- Family: Cerambycidae
- Genus: Cornuscoparia
- Species: C. ochracea

Binomial name
- Cornuscoparia ochracea Jordan, 1894

Species of beetle

Cornuscoparia ochracea is a species of beetle in the family Cerambycidae. It was described by Karl Jordan in 1894. It is known from Papua New Guinea and Indonesia.
