= Cornuscoparia schlaginhaufeni =

Scientific classification
- Kingdom: Animalia
- Phylum: Arthropoda
- Class: Insecta
- Order: Coleoptera
- Suborder: Polyphaga
- Infraorder: Cucujiformia
- Family: Cerambycidae
- Genus: Cornuscoparia
- Species: C. schlaginhaufeni

Binomial name
- Cornuscoparia schlaginhaufeni (Heller, 1910)

Synonyms
- Jonthophana schlaginhaufeni Heller, 1910

Species of beetle

Cornuscoparia schlaginhaufeni is a species of beetle in the family Cerambycidae. It was described by Heller in 1910, originally under the genus Jonthophana. It is known from Papua New Guinea.
