= Nonochamus =

Scientific classification
- Kingdom: Animalia
- Phylum: Arthropoda
- Class: Insecta
- Order: Coleoptera
- Suborder: Polyphaga
- Infraorder: Cucujiformia
- Family: Cerambycidae
- Tribe: Lamiini
- Genus: Nonochamus; Dillon & Dillon, 1959

Genus of beetles

Nonochamus is a genus of beetle in the family Cerambycidae.

== Species ==
- Nonochamus biplagiatus (Breuning, 1935)
- Nonochamus congoanus (Breuning, 1935)
- Nonochamus distigma (Jordan, 1903)
- Nonochamus griseofasciatus (Breuning, 1935)
