= Nonochamus griseofasciatus =

Scientific classification
- Kingdom: Animalia
- Phylum: Arthropoda
- Class: Insecta
- Order: Coleoptera
- Suborder: Polyphaga
- Infraorder: Cucujiformia
- Family: Cerambycidae
- Genus: Nonochamus
- Species: N. griseofasciatus

Binomial name
- Nonochamus griseofasciatus (Breuning, 1935)

Synonyms
- Monochamus griseofasciatus Breuning, 1935

Species of beetle

Nonochamus griseofasciatus is a species of beetle in the family Cerambycidae. It was described by Stephan von Breuning in 1935.
