= Nonochamus distigma =

Scientific classification
- Domain: Eukaryota
- Kingdom: Animalia
- Phylum: Arthropoda
- Class: Insecta
- Order: Coleoptera
- Suborder: Polyphaga
- Infraorder: Cucujiformia
- Family: Cerambycidae
- Tribe: Lamiini
- Genus: Nonochamus
- Species: N. distigma

Binomial name
- Nonochamus distigma (Jordan, 1903)

Synonyms
- Monochamus distigma Jordan, 1903

Species of beetle

Nonochamus distigma is a species of beetle in the family Cerambycidae. It was described by Karl Jordan in 1903.
