= Nonochamus congoanus =

Scientific classification
- Kingdom: Animalia
- Phylum: Arthropoda
- Class: Insecta
- Order: Coleoptera
- Suborder: Polyphaga
- Infraorder: Cucujiformia
- Family: Cerambycidae
- Genus: Nonochamus
- Species: N. congoanus

Binomial name
- Nonochamus congoanus (Breuning, 1935)

Synonyms
- Monochamus congoanus Breuning, 1935

Species of beetle

Nonochamus congoanus is a species of beetle in the family Cerambycidae. It was described by Stephan von Breuning in 1935.
