= Paranamera ankangensis =

Scientific classification
- Kingdom: Animalia
- Phylum: Arthropoda
- Class: Insecta
- Order: Coleoptera
- Suborder: Polyphaga
- Infraorder: Cucujiformia
- Family: Cerambycidae
- Genus: Paranamera
- Species: P. ankangensis

Binomial name
- Paranamera ankangensis Chiang, 1981

Synonyms
- Paranamera ankanensis (Chiang) Hua, 2002 (misspelling)

Species of beetle

Paranamera ankangensis is a species of beetle in the family Cerambycidae. It was described by Chiang in 1981. It is known from China.
