= Paranamera =

Scientific classification
- Kingdom: Animalia
- Phylum: Arthropoda
- Class: Insecta
- Order: Coleoptera
- Suborder: Polyphaga
- Infraorder: Cucujiformia
- Family: Cerambycidae
- Tribe: Lamiini
- Genus: Paranamera; Breuning, 1935

Genus of beetles

Paranamera is a genus of longhorn beetles of the subfamily Lamiinae, containing the following species:

- Paranamera ankangensis Chiang, 1981
- Paranamera excisa Breuning, 1942
- Paranamera malaccensis Breuning, 1935
- Paranamera oculata Hüdepohl, 1994
