= Paranamera oculata =

Scientific classification
- Kingdom: Animalia
- Phylum: Arthropoda
- Class: Insecta
- Order: Coleoptera
- Suborder: Polyphaga
- Infraorder: Cucujiformia
- Family: Cerambycidae
- Genus: Paranamera
- Species: P. oculata

Binomial name
- Paranamera oculata Hüdepohl, 1994

Species of beetle

Paranamera oculata is a species of beetle in the family Cerambycidae. It was described by Karl-Ernst Hüdepohl in 1994. It is known from Thailand and Myanmar.
