= Meliochamus =

Scientific classification
- Domain: Eukaryota
- Kingdom: Animalia
- Phylum: Arthropoda
- Class: Insecta
- Order: Coleoptera
- Suborder: Polyphaga
- Infraorder: Cucujiformia
- Family: Cerambycidae
- Tribe: Lamiini
- Genus: Meliochamus; Dillon & Dillon, 1959

Genus of beetles

Meliochamus is a genus of beetle in the family Cerambycidae.

== Species ==
- Meliochamus fallax Dillon & Dillon, 1959
- Meliochamus homoeus (Jordan, 1903)
- Meliochamus isochrous (Jordan, 1903)
