= Meliochamus fallax =

Scientific classification
- Domain: Eukaryota
- Kingdom: Animalia
- Phylum: Arthropoda
- Class: Insecta
- Order: Coleoptera
- Suborder: Polyphaga
- Infraorder: Cucujiformia
- Family: Cerambycidae
- Tribe: Lamiini
- Genus: Meliochamus
- Species: M. fallax

Binomial name
- Meliochamus fallax Dillon & Dillon, 1959

Synonyms
- Monochamus fallax (Dillon & Dillon, 1959)

Species of beetle

Meliochamus fallax is a species of beetle in the family Cerambycidae. It was described by Dillon and Dillon in 1959.
