= Meliochamus homoeus =

Scientific classification
- Domain: Eukaryota
- Kingdom: Animalia
- Phylum: Arthropoda
- Class: Insecta
- Order: Coleoptera
- Suborder: Polyphaga
- Infraorder: Cucujiformia
- Family: Cerambycidae
- Tribe: Lamiini
- Genus: Meliochamus
- Species: M. homoeus

Binomial name
- Meliochamus homoeus (Jordan, 1903)

Synonyms
- Monochamus homoeus Jordan, 1903

Species of beetle

Meliochamus homoeus is a species of beetle in the family Cerambycidae. It was described by Karl Jordan in 1903. It is known from Cameroon, Gabon, Rwanda, Equatorial Guinea, the Central African Republic, the Republic of the Congo, and the Democratic Republic of the Congo.
