= Meliochamus isochrous =

Scientific classification
- Domain: Eukaryota
- Kingdom: Animalia
- Phylum: Arthropoda
- Class: Insecta
- Order: Coleoptera
- Suborder: Polyphaga
- Infraorder: Cucujiformia
- Family: Cerambycidae
- Tribe: Lamiini
- Genus: Meliochamus
- Species: M. isochrous

Binomial name
- Meliochamus isochrous (Jordan, 1903)

Synonyms
- Monochamus isochrous Jordan, 1903

Species of beetle

Meliochamus isochrous is a species of beetle in the family Cerambycidae. It was described by Karl Jordan in 1903.
