= Paradiallus =

Scientific classification
- Kingdom: Animalia
- Phylum: Arthropoda
- Class: Insecta
- Order: Coleoptera
- Suborder: Polyphaga
- Infraorder: Cucujiformia
- Family: Cerambycidae
- Subfamily: Lamiinae
- Tribe: Monochamini
- Genus: Paradiallus; Breuning, 1950

Genus of beetles

Paradiallus is a genus of longhorned beetles in the family Cerambycidae. There are about seven described species in Paradiallus, found in Southeast Asia.

== Species ==
These seven species belong to the genus Paradiallus:

- Paradiallus albomaculatus (Breuning, 1966) (Philippines)
- Paradiallus cabigasi Vives, 2017 (Philippines)
- Paradiallus duaulti Breuning, 1962 (Laos)
- Paradiallus flavolineatus Vives, 2017 (Philippines)
- Paradiallus irroratus (Heller, 1924) (Philippines)
- Paradiallus lumawigi (Hüdepohl, 1990) (Philippines)
- Paradiallus vietnamicus Barševskis, 2020 (Vietnam)
