= Paradiallus irroratus =

Scientific classification
- Domain: Eukaryota
- Kingdom: Animalia
- Phylum: Arthropoda
- Class: Insecta
- Order: Coleoptera
- Suborder: Polyphaga
- Infraorder: Cucujiformia
- Family: Cerambycidae
- Subfamily: Lamiinae
- Tribe: Monochamini
- Genus: Paradiallus
- Species: P. irroratus

Binomial name
- Paradiallus irroratus (Heller, 1924)

Synonyms
- Xoes irroratus Heller, 1924; Myagrus irroratus (Heller, 1924); Paradiallus ochreostictus Breuning, 1950; Paraxoes semperi Breuning, 1958

Species of beetle

Paradiallus irroratus is a species of beetle in the family Cerambycidae, and the type species of its genus. It was described by Heller in 1924, originally under the genus Xoes. It is known from the Philippines.
