= Paradiallus albomaculatus =

Scientific classification
- Kingdom: Animalia
- Phylum: Arthropoda
- Class: Insecta
- Order: Coleoptera
- Suborder: Polyphaga
- Infraorder: Cucujiformia
- Family: Cerambycidae
- Subfamily: Lamiinae
- Tribe: Monochamini
- Genus: Paradiallus
- Species: P. albomaculatus

Binomial name
- Paradiallus albomaculatus (Breuning, 1966)

Synonyms
- Paraxoes albomaculatus Breuning, 1966

Species of beetle

Paradiallus albomaculatus is a species of beetle in the family Cerambycidae. It was described by Stephan von Breuning in 1966. It is known from the Philippines.
