= Agniolamia pardalis =

Scientific classification
- Kingdom: Animalia
- Phylum: Arthropoda
- Class: Insecta
- Order: Coleoptera
- Suborder: Polyphaga
- Infraorder: Cucujiformia
- Family: Cerambycidae
- Genus: Agniolamia
- Species: A. pardalis

Binomial name
- Agniolamia pardalis (Jordan, 1903)

Species of beetle

Agniolamia pardalis is a species of beetle in the family Cerambycidae. It was described by Karl Jordan in 1903.

== Subspecies ==
- Agniolamia pardalis camerunensis Dillon & Dillon, 1959
- Agniolamia pardalis pardalis (Jordan, 1903)
