= Agniolamia =

Scientific classification
- Kingdom: Animalia
- Phylum: Arthropoda
- Class: Insecta
- Order: Coleoptera
- Suborder: Polyphaga
- Infraorder: Cucujiformia
- Family: Cerambycidae
- Subfamily: Lamiinae
- Tribe: Monochamini
- Genus: Agniolamia; Breuning, 1943

Genus of beetles

Agniolamia is a genus of longhorn beetles of the subfamily Lamiinae, containing the following species:

- Agniolamia albovittata Breuning, 1977
- Agniolamia pardalis (Jordan, 1903)
