= Agniolamia albovittata =

Scientific classification
- Kingdom: Animalia
- Phylum: Arthropoda
- Class: Insecta
- Order: Coleoptera
- Suborder: Polyphaga
- Infraorder: Cucujiformia
- Family: Cerambycidae
- Genus: Agniolamia
- Species: A. albovittata

Binomial name
- Agniolamia albovittata Breuning, 1977

Species of beetle

Agniolamia albovittata is a species of beetle in the family Cerambycidae. It was described by Stephan von Breuning in 1977. It is known from Gabon.
