= Rufohammus =

Scientific classification
- Kingdom: Animalia
- Phylum: Arthropoda
- Class: Insecta
- Order: Coleoptera
- Suborder: Polyphaga
- Infraorder: Cucujiformia
- Family: Cerambycidae
- Tribe: Lamiini
- Genus: Rufohammus

Genus of beetles

Rufohammus is a genus of longhorn beetles of the subfamily Lamiinae, containing the following species:

- Rufohammus rufescens Breuning, 1939
- Rufohammus rufifrons (Aurivillius, 1927)
