= Rufohammus rufifrons =

Scientific classification
- Kingdom: Animalia
- Phylum: Arthropoda
- Class: Insecta
- Order: Coleoptera
- Suborder: Polyphaga
- Infraorder: Cucujiformia
- Family: Cerambycidae
- Genus: Rufohammus
- Species: R. rufifrons

Binomial name
- Rufohammus rufifrons (Aurivillius, 1927)

Synonyms
- Mimohammus rufifrons Aurivillius, 1927

Species of beetle

Rufohammus rufifrons is a species of beetle in the family Cerambycidae. It was described by Per Olof Christopher Aurivillius in 1927. It is known from Brunei and Borneo.
