= Rufohammus rufescens =

Scientific classification
- Kingdom: Animalia
- Phylum: Arthropoda
- Class: Insecta
- Order: Coleoptera
- Suborder: Polyphaga
- Infraorder: Cucujiformia
- Family: Cerambycidae
- Genus: Rufohammus
- Species: R. rufescens

Binomial name
- Rufohammus rufescens Breuning, 1939

Species of beetle

Rufohammus rufescens is a species of beetle in the family Cerambycidae. It was described by Stephan von Breuning in 1939. It is known from China.
