= Parathyastus =

Scientific classification
- Kingdom: Animalia
- Phylum: Arthropoda
- Class: Insecta
- Order: Coleoptera
- Suborder: Polyphaga
- Infraorder: Cucujiformia
- Family: Cerambycidae
- Tribe: Lamiini
- Genus: Parathyastus

Genus of beetles

Parathyastus is a genus of longhorn beetles of the subfamily Lamiinae, containing the following species:

- Parathyastus alboconspersus Aurivillius, 1913
- Parathyastus flavoguttatus Breuning, 1956
