= Parathyastus flavoguttatus =

Scientific classification
- Kingdom: Animalia
- Phylum: Arthropoda
- Class: Insecta
- Order: Coleoptera
- Suborder: Polyphaga
- Infraorder: Cucujiformia
- Family: Cerambycidae
- Genus: Parathyastus
- Species: P. flavoguttatus

Binomial name
- Parathyastus flavoguttatus Breuning, 1956

Species of beetle

Parathyastus flavoguttatus is a species of beetle in the family Cerambycidae. It was described by Stephan von Breuning in 1956. It is known from the Philippines.
