= Cribrihammus =

Scientific classification
- Kingdom: Animalia
- Phylum: Arthropoda
- Class: Insecta
- Order: Coleoptera
- Suborder: Polyphaga
- Infraorder: Cucujiformia
- Family: Cerambycidae
- Tribe: Lamiini
- Genus: Cribrihammus

Genus of beetles

Cribrihammus is a genus of longhorn beetles of the subfamily Lamiinae, containing the following species:

- Cribrihammus granulosus Dillon & Dillon, 1959
- Cribrihammus rugosus Dillon & Dillon, 1959
