= Cribrihammus granulosus =

Scientific classification
- Kingdom: Animalia
- Phylum: Arthropoda
- Class: Insecta
- Order: Coleoptera
- Suborder: Polyphaga
- Infraorder: Cucujiformia
- Family: Cerambycidae
- Genus: Cribrihammus
- Species: C. granulosus

Binomial name
- Cribrihammus granulosus Dillon & Dillon, 1959

Species of beetle

Cribrihammus granulosus is a species of beetle in the family Cerambycidae. It was described by Dillon and Dillon in 1959. It is known from Kenya.
