= Uraechoides taomeiae =

Scientific classification
- Kingdom: Animalia
- Phylum: Arthropoda
- Class: Insecta
- Order: Coleoptera
- Suborder: Polyphaga
- Infraorder: Cucujiformia
- Family: Cerambycidae
- Genus: Uraechoides
- Species: U. taomeiae

Binomial name
- Uraechoides taomeiae Hayashi, Nara & Yu, 1995

Species of beetle

Uraechoides taomeiae is a species of beetle in the family Cerambycidae. It was described by Masao Hayashi, Nara and Yu in 1995. It is known from Taiwan.
