= Uraechoides vivesi =

Scientific classification
- Kingdom: Animalia
- Phylum: Arthropoda
- Class: Insecta
- Order: Coleoptera
- Suborder: Polyphaga
- Infraorder: Cucujiformia
- Family: Cerambycidae
- Genus: Uraechoides
- Species: U. vivesi

Binomial name
- Uraechoides vivesi Breuning, 1981

Species of beetle

Uraechoides vivesi is a species of beetle in the family Cerambycidae. It was described by Stephan von Breuning in 1981.
