= Uraechoides =

Scientific classification
- Kingdom: Animalia
- Phylum: Arthropoda
- Class: Insecta
- Order: Coleoptera
- Suborder: Polyphaga
- Infraorder: Cucujiformia
- Family: Cerambycidae
- Tribe: Lamiini
- Genus: Uraechoides

Genus of beetles

Uraechoides is a genus of longhorn beetles of the subfamily Lamiinae, containing the following species:

- Uraechoides taomeiae Hayashi, Nara & Yu, 1995
- Uraechoides vivesi Breuning, 1981
