= List of beetles of Thailand =

Thousands of beetle (Coleoptera) species are found in Thailand. This list gives a selection of about 500 beetle species (and/or subspecies) as listed in Ek-Amnuay (2008).

== Family Cicindelidae (tiger beetles) ==
- Tricondyla
  - Tricondyla annulicornis
  - Tricondyla mellyi
- Neocollyris
  - Neocollyris bonellii
- Collyris
  - Collyris mniszechii
- Cylindera
  - Cylindera minuta
- Calochroa
  - Calochroa anometallescens
  - Calochroa cariana
  - Calochroa elegantula
  - Calochroa flavomaculata
  - Calochroa laurae
  - Calochroa mouhoti
  - Calochroa shozoi
  - Calochroa tritoma
- Cosmodela (= Cicindela)
  - Cosmodela aurulenta
  - Cosmodela barmanica
  - Cosmodela duponti
  - Cosmodela juxtata
  - Cosmodela virgula
- Lophyra
  - Lophyra striolata

== Family Lucanidae (stag beetles) ==
- Lucanus
  - Lucanus coronatus
  - Lucanus fairmairei
  - Lucanus fryi
  - Lucanus koyamai
  - Lucanus laminifer
  - Lucanus miyashitai
  - Lucanus sericeus
- Hexarthrius
  - Hexarthrius deyrollei
  - Hexarthrius nigritus
  - Hexarthrius parryi
  - Hexarthrius vitalisi
- Calcodes
  - Calcodes aeratus
- Odontolabis
  - Odontolabis cuvera
  - Odontolabis dalmani
  - Odontolabis elegans
  - Odontolabis fallaciosa
  - Odontolabis femoralis
  - Odontolabis gazella
  - Odontolabis latipennis
  - Odontolabis macrocephalus
  - Odontolabis mouhoti
  - Odontolabis sinensis
  - Odontolabis siva
- Neolucanus
  - Neolucanus brevis
  - Neolucanus castanopterus
  - Neolucanus flavipennis
  - Neolucanus giganteus
  - Neolucanus latus
  - Neolucanus maekajanensis
  - Neolucanus maximus
  - Neolucanus nitidus
  - Neolucanus parryi
  - Neolucanus pseudopacus
  - Neolucanus rondoni
  - Neolucanus saundersi
  - Neolucanus sinicus
- Figulus
  - Figulus caviceps
- Nigidius
  - Nigidius birmanicus
  - Nigidius dawnae
  - Nigidius distinctus
  - Nigidius elongatus
- Allotopus
  - Allotopus babai
  - Allotopus moellenkampi
- Cyclommatus
  - Cyclommatus bicolor
  - Cyclommatus canaliculatus
  - Cyclommatus chiangmaienesis
  - Cyclommatus lunifer
  - Cyclommatus multidentatus
  - Cyclommatus pahangensis
  - Cyclommatus saltini
- Rhaetulus
  - Rhaetulus boileaui
  - Rhaetulus didieri
  - Rhaetulus speciosus
- Prismognathus
  - Prismognathus kurosawai
- Prosopocoilus
  - Prosopocoilus asaetosus
  - Prosopocoilus astacoides
  - Prosopocoilus biplagiatus
  - Prosopocoilus buddha
  - Prosopocoilus bulbosus
  - Prosopocoilus crenulidens
  - Prosopocoilus giraffa
  - Prosopocoilus inquinatus
  - Prosopocoilus jenkinsi
  - Prosopocoilus kannegieteri
  - Prosopocoilus kuijteni
  - Prosopocoilus mandibularis
  - Prosopocoilus mohnikei
  - Prosopocoilus nigritus
  - Prosopocoilus occipitalis
  - Prosopocoilus ovatus
  - Prosopocoilus oweni
  - Prosopocoilus pascoei
  - Prosopocoilus passaloides
  - Prosopocoilus pseudospineus
  - Prosopocoilus sericeus
  - Prosopocoilus spineus
  - Prosopocoilus squamilateris
  - Prosopocoilus superbus
  - Prosopocoilus suturalis
  - Prosopocoilus taronii
  - Prosopocoilus zebra
- Macrodorcas
  - Macrodorcas bisignatus
  - Macrodorcas giselae
  - Macrodorcas pseudaxis
- Hemisodorcus (= Nipponodorcus)
  - Hemisodorcus arrowi
- Serrognathus
  - Serrognathus lineatopunctatus
  - Serrognathus platymelus
  - Serrognathus reichei
  - Serrognathus subtaurus
  - Serrognathus taurus
  - Serrognathus titanus
- Dynodorcus
  - Dynodorcus antaeus
  - Dynodorcus curvidens
  - Dynodorcus volscens
- Dorcus
  - Dorcus gracilicornis
- Velutinodorcus
  - Velutinodorcus velutinus
- Aegus
  - Aegus amplus
  - Aegus chelifer
  - Aegus parallelus

== Family Passalidae (bess beetles) ==
- Aceraius
  - Aceraius grandis
- Ceracupes
  - Ceracupes fronticornis
- Leptaulax
  - Leptaulax cyclotaenius
  - Leptaulax dentatus
- Tiberioides
  - Tiberioides borealis
  - Tiberioides kuwerti

== Family Scarabaeidae (scarab beetles) ==
=== Subfamily Dynastinae ===
- Blabephorus
  - Blabephorus pinguis
- Chalcosoma
  - Chalcosoma atlas
  - Chalcosoma caucasus
- Clyster
  - Clyster retusus
- Eophileurus
  - Eophileurus chinensis
  - Eophileurus cingalensis
  - Eophileurus platypterus
- Eupatorus
  - Eupatorus birmanicus
  - Eupatorus gracilicornis
  - Eupatorus siamensis
- Oryctes
  - Oryctes gnu
  - Oryctes rhinoceros
- Pachyoryctes
  - Pachyoryctes solidus
- Trichogomphus
  - Trichogomphus martabani
  - Trichogomphus mongol
- Trypoxylus
  - Trypoxylus dichotomus
  - Trypoxylus politus
- Xylotrupes
  - Xylotrupes gideon

=== Subfamily Euchirinae (long-armed beetles) ===
- Cheirotonus
  - Cheirotonus gestroi
  - Cheirotonus parryi

=== Subfamily Coprinae (Scarabaeinae) (dung beetles) ===
- Catharsius
  - Catharsius molossus
- Copris
  - Copris magicus
  - Copris nevinsoni
  - Copris signatus
- Digitonthophagus
  - Digitonthophagus bonasus
- Garreta
  - Garreta ruficornis
- Gymnopleurus
  - Gymnopleurus aethiops
  - Gymnopleurus sinuatus
- Heliocopris
  - Heliocopris bucephalus
  - Heliocopris dominus
- Liatongus
  - Liatongus rhadamistus
- Onitis
  - Onitis excavatus
  - Onitis philemon
  - Onitis singhalensis
  - Onitis siva
  - Onitis virens
- Onthophagus
  - Onthophagus imperator
  - Onthophagus seniculus
- Synapsis
  - Synapsis birmanicus
  - Synapsis tridens

=== Subfamily Geotrupinae ===
- Enoplotrupes
  - Enoplotrupes sharpi

=== Subfamily Melolonthinae (June beetles) ===
- Lepidiota
  - Lepidiota stigma
- Polyphylla
  - Polyphylla tonkinensis

=== Subfamily Rutelinae ===
- Adoretus
  - Adoretus compressus
- Anomala
  - Anomala dimidiata
  - Anomala diversipennis
  - Anomala grandis
  - Anomala variegata
- Dicaulocephalus
  - Dicaulocephalus feae
  - Dicaulocephalus tetsuoi
- Fruhstorferia
  - Fruhstorferia birmanica
  - Fruhstorferia dohertyi
  - Fruhstorferia sexmaculata
- Parastasia
  - Parastasia alternata
  - Parastasia birmana
  - Parastasia ochracea
  - Parastasia sulcipennis
- Peltonotus
  - Peltonotus morio
- Peperonota
  - Peperonota harringtoni

=== Subfamily Cetoniinae (flower beetles) ===
==== Tribe Cremastochellini ====
- Campsiura
  - Campsiura gloriosa
  - Campsiura insignis
  - Campsiura javanica
- Clinterocera
  - Clinterocera jucunda
- Coenochilus
  - Coenochilus apicalis
- Cymophorus
  - Cymophorus pulchellus
- Goliathopsis
  - Goliathopsis duponti
  - Goliathopsis ferreroi

==== Tribe Schizorhinini ====
- Agestrata
  - Agestrata orichalca
- Thaumastopeus
  - Thaumastopeus arrowi
  - Thaumastopeus nigritus
  - Thaumastopeus pugnator

==== Tribe Goliathini ====
- Anomalocera
  - Anomalocera subopaca
- Dicheros
  - Dicheros bicornis
  - Dicheros inermiceps
  - Dicheros siamensis
- Dicranocephalus
  - Dicranocephalus wallichii
- Euchloropus
  - Euchloropus laetus
- Heterorrhina
  - Heterorrhina leonardi
  - Heterorrhina micans
- Ingrisma
  - Ingrisma bilobiceps
  - Ingrisma burmanica
  - Ingrisma euryrrhina
- Jumnos
  - Jumnos ferreroiminettiique
  - Jumnos ruckeri
- Platynocephalus
  - Platynocephalus arnaudi
  - Platynocephalus miyashitai
- Rhomborhina
  - Rhomborhina jeannelli
  - Rhomborhina mellyi
  - Rhomborhina resplendens
- Trigonophorus
  - Trigonophorus feae
  - Trigonophorus foveiceps
  - Trigonophorus nepalensis
- Torynorrhina
  - Torynorrhina distincta
  - Torynorrhina flammea
  - Torynorrhina thiemei

==== Tribe Cetoniini ====
- Cetonia
  - Cetonia rutilans
- Gametis
  - Gametis bealiae
  - Gametis histrio
- Glycosia
  - Glycosia tricolor
- Glycyphana
  - Glycyphana catena
  - Glycyphana chamnongi
  - Glycyphana fadilae
  - Glycyphana festiva
  - Glycyphana horsfieldi
  - Glycyphana malayensis
  - Glycyphana nepalensis
  - Glycyphana nicobarica
  - Glycyphana ornata
  - Glycyphana quadricolor
  - Glycyphana sinuata
  - Glycyphana swainsonii
- Gymnophana
  - Gymnophana oatesi
- Oxythyrea
  - Oxythyrea cinctella
- Protaetia
  - Protaetia acuminata
  - Protaetia cariana
  - Protaetia caudata
  - Protaetia chaminadei
  - Protaetia chicheryi
  - Protaetia fulgidipes
  - Protaetia fusca
  - Protaetia himalayana
  - Protaetia montana
  - Protaetia niveoguttata
  - Protaetia rubrocuprea
  - Protaetia ventralis

==== Tribe Gymnetini ====
- Clinteria
  - Clinteria atra
  - Clinteria ducalis
  - Clinteria egens

==== Tribe Diplognathini ====
- Anthracophora
  - Anthracophora siamensis

==== Tribe Phaedimini ====
- Theodosia
  - Theodosia ayuthia
  - Theodosia perakensis
- Mycteristes
  - Mycteristes minettii
  - Mycteristes tibetanus

==== Tribe Taenioderini ====
- Clerota
  - Clerota rigifica
- Coilodera
  - Coilodera penicillata
- Euselates
  - Euselates laotica
  - Euselates ornata
  - Euselates perraudieri
  - Euselates schoenfeldti
  - Euselates virgata
- Ixorida
  - Ixorida magnierei
  - Ixorida mouhoti
- Meroloba
  - Meroloba suturalis
- Taeniodera
  - Taeniodera borneensis
  - Taeniodera flavofasciata
  - Taeniodera idolica
  - Taeniodera malabariensis
  - Taeniodera puncticollis
  - Taeniodera sericea
  - Taeniodera sericoides
  - Taeniodera simillima

== Family Buprestidae (jewel beetles) ==
=== Subfamily Julodinae ===
- Sternocera
  - Sternocera aequisignata
  - Sternocera chrysis
  - Sternocera punctatofaveata
  - Sternocera ruficornis

=== Subfamily Polycestinae ===
- Acmaeodera
  - Acmaeodera coomani
  - Acmaeodera ichikoae
  - Acmaeodera interrupta
  - Acmaeodera stictipennis
- Cochinchinula
  - Cochinchinula quadriareolata
- Mastogenius
  - Mastogenius taoi
- Microacmaeodera
  - Microacmaeodera rolciki
- Odettea
  - Odettea laosensis
- Paratrachys
  - Paratrachys chinensis
- Schoutedeniastes (= Polyctesis)
  - Schoutedeniastes ohkurai
- Ptosima
  - Ptosima strandi
- Strigoptera
  - Strigoptera bimaculata

=== Subfamily Chrysochroinae ===
- Catoxantha
  - Catoxantha borneensis
  - Catoxantha chunrami
  - Catoxantha opulenta
  - Catoxantha pierrei
- Chalcophora
  - Chalcophora yunnana
- Chrysochroa
  - Chrysochroa baudoni
  - Chrysochroa buqueti
  - Chrysochroa corbetti
  - Chrysochroa edwardsii
  - Chrysochroa ephippigera
  - Chrysochroa fulgens
  - Chrysochroa fulminans
  - Chrysochroa marinae
  - Chrysochroa mniszechii
  - Chrysochroa parryi
  - Chrysochroa purpureiventris
  - Chrysochroa rajah
  - Chrysochroa rondoni
  - Chrysochroa rugicollis
  - Chrysochroa saundersii
  - Chrysochroa thailandica
  - Chrysochroa unnoi
  - Chrysochroa viridisplendens
  - Chrysochroa vittata
  - Chrysochroa wiwuti
- Cyalithus
  - Cyalithus cohici
  - Cyalithus vitalisi
- Demochroa
  - Demochroa bowringi
  - Demochroa gratiosa
- Evides
  - Evides fairmairei
- Iridotaenia
  - Iridotaenia chrysostoma
  - Iridotaenia igniceps
  - Iridotaenia tonkinea
- Lampetis
  - Lampetis affinis
  - Lampetis psilopteroides
  - Lampetis puncticollis
  - Lampetis viridicuprea
- Megaloxantha
  - Megaloxantha brunnea
  - Megaloxantha concolor
  - Megaloxantha gigantea
  - Megaloxantha longiantennata
  - Megaloxantha mouhotii
- Micropistus
  - Micropistus igneiceps
  - Micropistus microcephalus
- Philocteanus
  - Philocteanus moricii
- Chrysopistus
  - Chrysopistus savangvattanai

=== Subfamily Buprestinae ===
- Anthaxia
  - Anthaxia coomani
  - Anthaxia rondoni
- Bellamyola
  - Bellamyola mouhoti
- Pseudhyperantha
  - Pseudhyperantha pinratanai
- Belionota
  - Belionota ignicollis
  - Belionota prasina
- Chrysobothris
  - Chrysobothris superba
- Coomaniella
  - Coomaniella purpurascens
- Karenaxia
  - Karenaxia similis
- Lamprodila
  - Lamprodila magnifica
  - Lamprodila sarrauti
- Philanthaxia
  - Philanthaxia aenea
  - Philanthaxia purpuriceps

=== Subfamily Agrilinae ===
- Coraebus
  - Coraebus wiwuti
- Habroloma
  - Habroloma lateroalbum

=== Subfamily Galbellinae ===
- Galbella
  - Galbella violacea

== Family Meloidae (blister beetles) ==
- Cissites
  - Cissites maxillosa
- Eletica
  - Eletica castanea
- Epicauta
  - Epicauta hirticornis
  - Epicauta maklini
  - Epicauta waterhousei
- Mylabris
  - Mylabris cichorii
  - Mylabris phalerata

== Family Disteniidae (longicorn beetles) ==
- Cyrtonops
  - Cyrtonops punctipennis

== Family Cerambycidae ==
(A longer list of Cerambycidae species can be found at the Thailand Nature Project's website.)

=== Subfamily Prioninae ===
- Macrotoma
  - Macrotoma crenata
  - Macrotoma fisheri
- Rhaphipodus
  - Rhaphipodus fatalis
  - Rhaphipodus fruhstorferi

==== Tribe Eurypodini ====
- Eurypoda
  - Eurypoda batesi
  - Eurypoda nigrita
- Megopis
  - Megopis costipennis
  - Megopis maculosa
  - Megopis marginalis
  - Megopis ornaticollis
  - Megopis procera
  - Megopis sinica

==== Tribe Prionini ====
- Dorysthenes
  - Dorysthenes beli
  - Dorysthenes buqueti
  - Dorysthenes granulosus
  - Dorysthenes walkeri
- Prionomma
  - Prionomma bigibbosus

==== Tribe Anacolini ====
- Sarmydus
  - Sarmydus antennatus

=== Subfamily Philinae ===
- Philus
  - Philus costatus

=== Subfamily Leptirinae ===
- Strangalia
  - Strangalia duffyi

=== Subfamily Cerambycinae ===
==== Tribe Methiini ====
- Oplatocera
  - Oplatocera callidiosa
- Xystrocera
  - Xystrocera festiva
  - Xystrocera globosa

==== Tribe Hesperophanini ====
- Gnatholea
  - Gnatholea eburifera
  - Gnatholea subnuda
- Stromatium
  - Stromatium longicorne
- Zoodes
  - Zoodes fulguratus

==== Tribe Cerambycini ====
- Aeolesthes
  - Aeolesthes aureopilosa
  - Aeolesthes aurifaber
  - Aeolesthes laosensis
  - Aeolesthes sinensis
- Cyriopalus
  - Cyriopalus wallacei
- Derolus
  - Derolus argentesignatus
- Hoplocerambyx
  - Hoplocerambyx spinicornis
- Massicus
  - Massicus trilineatus
- Neocerambyx
  - Neocerambyx gigas
  - Neocerambyx grandis
- Plocaederus
  - Plocaederus obesus
  - Plocaederus ruficornis
- Rhytidodera
  - Rhytidodera grandis
  - Rhytidodera integra
- Xoanodera
  - Xoanodera regularis
  - Xoanodera striata

==== Tribe Callidiopini ====
- Ceresium
  - Ceresium leucosticticum
- Trinophylum
  - Trinophylum descarpentriesi

==== Tribe Prothemini ====
- Prothema
  - Prothema aurata

==== Tribe Callichromini ====
- Anubis
  - Anubis bipustulatus
  - Anubis inermis
- Aphrodisium
  - Aphrodisium cantori
  - Aphrodisium faldermannii
  - Aphrodisium neoxenum
  - Aphrodisium subplicatum
- Chelidonium
  - Chelidonium buddleiae
  - Chelidonium venereum
- Chloridolum
  - Chloridolum alcmene
  - Chloridolum laotium
- Embrikstrandia
  - Embrikstrandia bicolor
  - Embrikstrandia unifasciata
- Nothopeus
  - Nothopeus drescheri
  - Nothopeus hemipterus
- Pachyteria
  - Pachyteria dimidiata
  - Pachyteria violaceothoracica
- Polyzonus
  - Polyzonus latemaculatus
  - Polyzonus nitidicollis
  - Polyzonus obtusus
  - Polyzonus pakxensis
  - Polyzonus sinensis
  - Polyzonus subobtusus
  - Polyzonus tetraspilotus
- Zonopterus
  - Zonopterus flavitarsis

==== Tribe Purpuricenini ====
- Euryphagus
  - Euryphagus lundii
- Pavieia
  - Pavieia superba
- Purpuricenus
  - Purpuricenus malaccensis

==== Tribe Pyrestini ====
- Erythrus
  - Erythrus championi
  - Erythrus laticornis
- Pachylocerus
  - Pachylocerus sulcatus
- Rosalia
  - Rosalia decempunctata
  - Rosalia formosa
  - Rosalia lameerei

==== Tribe Clytini ====
- Chlorophorus
  - Chlorophorus annularis
  - Chlorophorus arciferus
  - Chlorophorus rubricollis
  - Chlorophorus sappho
  - Chlorophorus siamensis
- Clytosaurus
  - Clytosaurus siamensis
- Demonax
  - Demonax albidofasciatus
  - Demonax elongatus
  - Demonax gracilestriatus
  - Demonax literatus
- Perissus
  - Perissus mimicus
  - Rhaphipodus hopei
- Rhaphuma
  - Rhaphuma diana
  - Rhaphuma horsfieldi
  - Rhaphuma patkaina
  - Rhaphuma phiale
  - Rhaphuma quadrimaculata
- Sclethrus
  - Sclethrus amoenus
- Xylotrechus
  - Xylotrechus chinensis
  - Xylotrechus magicus
  - Xylotrechus unicarinatus

==== Tribe Cleomenini ====
- Cleomenes
  - Cleomenes nigricollis
- Nida
  - Nida flavovittata

=== Subfamily Lamiinae ===
==== Tribe Mesosini ====
- Agelasta
  - Agelasta birmanica
- Coptops
  - Coptops annulipes
- Golsinda
  - Golsinda basicornis
- Mesosa
  - Mesosa nigrofasciaticollis

==== Tribe Xylorhizini ====
- Thylactus
  - Thylactus simulans
- Xylorhiza
  - Xylorhiza adusta

==== Tribe Apomecynini ====
- Apomecyna
  - Apomecyna niveosparsa
  - Apomecyna saltator
- Pemptolasius
  - Pemptolasius humeralis

==== Tribe Agapanthiini ====
- Antennohyllisia
  - Antennohyllisia rondoni
- Eucomatocera
  - Eucomatocera vittata
- Pothyne
  - Pothyne variegata

==== Tribe Pteropliini ====
- Alidus
  - Alidus biplagiatus
- Mispila
  - Mispila curvilinea
- Niphona
  - Niphona falaizei
  - Niphona longesignata
  - Niphona rondoni
- Pterolophia
  - Pterolophia zebrina
- Sthenias
  - Sthenias pascoei
  - Tenebrio molitor

==== Tribe Morimopsini ====
- Lamiodorcadion
  - Lamiodorcadion laosense

==== Tribe Lamiini ====
- Acalolepta
  - Acalolepta pseudospeciosa
  - Acalolepta sericeipennis
- Anamera
  - Anamera alboguttata
  - Anamera harmandi
- Anoplophora
  - Anoplophora birmanica
  - Anoplophora elegans
  - Anoplophora horsfieldii
  - Anoplophora sollii
  - Anoplophora versteegi
  - Anoplophora zonator
- Arctolamia
  - Arctolamia fasciata
  - Arctolamia fruhstorferi
  - Arctolamia luteomaculata
  - Arctolamia villosa
- Aristobia
  - Aristobia approximator
  - Aristobia freneyi
  - Aristobia horridula
  - Aristobia voeti
- Blepephaeus
  - Blepephaeus lemoulti
  - Blepephaeus stigmosus
  - Blepephaeus succinctor
- Calothyrza
  - Calothyrza margaritifera
- Cerosterna
  - Cerosterna fabricii
  - Cerosterna pollinosa
  - Cerosterna rouyeri
- Epepeotes
  - Epepeotes luscus
- Eutaenia
  - Eutaenia corbetti
  - Eutaenia trifasciella
- Gerania
  - Gerania bosci
- Macrochenus
  - Macrochenus assamensis
  - Macrochenus isabellinus
- Paraleprodera
  - Paraleprodera cordifera
  - Paraleprodera crucifera
  - Paraleprodera insidiosa
  - Paraleprodera stephanus
- Parepepeotes
  - Parepepeotes breuningi
- Pharsalia
  - Pharsalia subgemmata
- Pseudomeges
  - Pseudomeges marmoratus
- Sarothrocera
  - Sarothrocera lowii
- Spinaristobia
  - Spinaristobia rondoni
- Stegenagapanthia
  - Stegenagapanthia albovittata
- Stratioceros
  - Stratioceros princeps
- Trachystolodes
  - Trachystolodes tonkinensis
- Thermonotus
  - Thermonotus nigripes

==== Tribe Batocerini ====
- Apriona
  - Apriona germari
- Batocera
  - Batocera davidis
  - Batocera lineolata
  - Batocera numitor
  - Batocera parryi
  - Batocera roylei
  - Batocera rubus
  - Batocera rufomaculata
  - Batocera victoriana

==== Tribe Gnomini ====
- Imantocera
  - Imantocera penicillata

==== Tribe Ancylonotini ====
- Palimna
  - Palimna annulata

==== Tribe Dorcaschematini ====
- Cylindrecamptus
  - Cylindrecamptus lineatus
- Microlenecamptus
  - Microlenecamptus albonotatus
  - Microlenecamptus flavosignatus
- Olenecamptus
  - Olenecamptus bilobus
  - Olenecamptus dominus
  - Olenecamptus laosus
  - Olenecamptus quinquemaculatus
  - Olenecamptus siamensis

==== Tribe Crossotini ====
- Moechotypa
  - Moechotypa coomani
  - Moechotypa suffusa

==== Tribe Petrognathini ====
- Ioesse
  - Ioesse sanguinolenta
- Threnetica
  - Threnetica lacrymans

==== Tribe Ceroplesini ====
- Diastocera
  - Diastocera wallichi

==== Tribe Astathini ====
- Astathes
  - Astathes gibbicollis
  - Astathes tibialis

==== Tribe Saperdini ====
- Glenea
  - Glenea aeolis
  - Glenea astathiformis
  - Glenea cantor
  - Glenea elegans
  - Glenea laosensis
  - Glenea laosica
  - Glenea mediotransversevittata
  - Glenea proserpina
  - Glenea pulchra
  - Glenea indiana

== Family Trictenotomidae ==
- Trictenotoma
  - Trictenotoma childreni
  - Trictenotoma davidi
  - Trictenotoma mouhoti
- Autocrates
  - Autocrates aeneus

== Others ==
- Mormolyce
  - Mormolyce phyllodes
- Mouhotia
  - Mouhotia planipennis

== See also ==
- List of ants of Thailand
- List of butterflies of Thailand
- List of species native to Thailand
