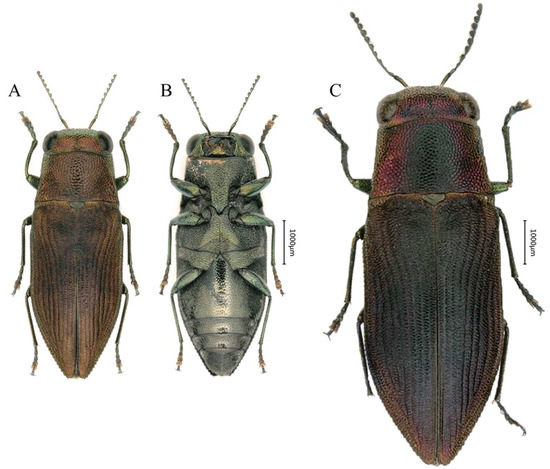

Scientific classification
- Kingdom: Animalia
- Phylum: Arthropoda
- Class: Insecta
- Order: Coleoptera
- Suborder: Polyphaga
- Infraorder: Elateriformia
- Family: Buprestidae
- Genus: Philanthaxia
- Species: P. lui

Binomial name
- Philanthaxia lui Ni & Song, 2025

= Philanthaxia lui =

Species of beetle

Philanthaxia lui is a species of beetle of the family Buprestidae. It is found in China (Hainan).

== Description ==
Adults reach a length of about 5.6 mm. They are green dorsally and bronze ventrally, with a metallic luster.

== Etymology ==
The species is named after Mr. Jiasheng Lu (Sanya, Hainan).
