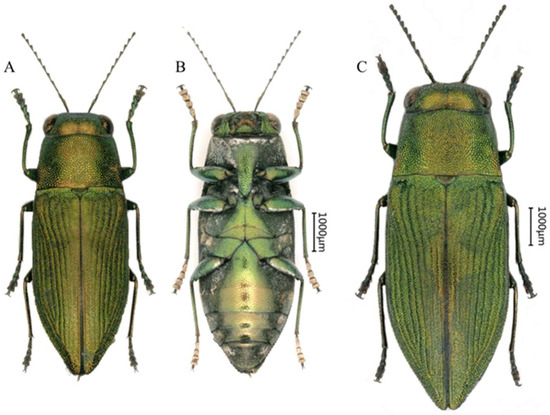

Scientific classification
- Kingdom: Animalia
- Phylum: Arthropoda
- Class: Insecta
- Order: Coleoptera
- Suborder: Polyphaga
- Infraorder: Elateriformia
- Family: Buprestidae
- Genus: Philanthaxia
- Species: P. longicornis

Binomial name
- Philanthaxia longicornis Ni & Song, 2025

= Philanthaxia longicornis =

Species of beetle

Philanthaxia longicornis is a species of beetle of the family Buprestidae. It is found in China (Hainan).

== Description ==
Adults reach a length of about 6.9 mm. The dorsal and ventral surfaces are golden-green with a metallic luster.

== Etymology ==
The species is named after its morphological character of long antennae.
