= Trachystolodes bimaculatus =

Scientific classification
- Kingdom: Animalia
- Phylum: Arthropoda
- Class: Insecta
- Order: Coleoptera
- Suborder: Polyphaga
- Infraorder: Cucujiformia
- Family: Cerambycidae
- Genus: Trachystolodes
- Species: T. bimaculatus

Binomial name
- Trachystolodes bimaculatus (Kriesche, 1924)

Synonyms
- Trachystola bimaculata Kriesche, 1924

Species of beetle

Trachystolodes bimaculatus is a species of beetle in the family Cerambycidae. It was described by Kriesche in 1924, originally as "Trachystola bimaculata." It is known from Vietnam.
