= Philanthaxia jakli =

Scientific classification
- Kingdom: Animalia
- Phylum: Arthropoda
- Clade: Pancrustacea
- Class: Insecta
- Order: Coleoptera
- Suborder: Polyphaga
- Infraorder: Elateriformia
- Family: Buprestidae
- Genus: Philanthaxia
- Species: P. jakli

Binomial name
- Philanthaxia jakli Bílý & Nakládal, 2011

Species of beetle

Philanthaxia jakli is a species of beetle that was discovered in Indonesia in July 2011. The beetle can be found in the Indonesian islands Sumatra, Borneo, and Lombok. As the specimens were obtained from locals, the biology and host plants of these new species remain unknown.
