= Stegenagapanthia nivalis =

Scientific classification
- Kingdom: Animalia
- Phylum: Arthropoda
- Class: Insecta
- Order: Coleoptera
- Suborder: Polyphaga
- Infraorder: Cucujiformia
- Family: Cerambycidae
- Genus: Stegenagapanthia
- Species: S. nivalis

Binomial name
- Stegenagapanthia nivalis Holzschuh, 2007

Species of beetle

Stegenagapanthia nivalis is a species of beetle in the family Cerambycidae. It was described by Holzschuh in 2007.
