= Taeniodera boettcheri =

Scientific classification
- Kingdom: Animalia
- Phylum: Arthropoda
- Clade: Pancrustacea
- Class: Insecta
- Order: Coleoptera
- Suborder: Polyphaga
- Infraorder: Scarabaeiformia
- Family: Scarabaeidae
- Genus: Taeniodera
- Species: T. boettcheri

Binomial name
- Taeniodera boettcheri (Moser, 1915)

Synonyms
- Macronota boettcheri Moser, 1915

Species of beetle

Taeniodera boettcheri is a species of beetle of the family Scarabaeidae. It is found in the Philippines (Palawan).

== Description ==
Adults reach a length of about 15–16 mm (0.59–0.63 in). They are similar to Taeniodera picta, but differs in colouration and shape of the clypeus. Males are black on the upper side except for the red shoulders, while in females, the elytra are red, a short black band begins within the shoulders and ends before the middle at the suture, and a black lateral band extends from the hind angles forward to slightly beyond the middle. The markings on the upper side are white in males and yellow in females. The head is strongly punctate, the punctures on the frons are short-bristled, the middle of the frons bears a longitudinal keel, and on either side of it is a more or less distinct white or yellow longitudinal band. The clypeus is slightly longer than wide, its anterior margin is arcuate. The antennae are blackish-brown. The pronotum is of a similar shape to that of picta, not quite as wide and rather sparsely punctate, the punctures being short-bristled. A white or yellow band runs from the middle of the lateral margin somewhat obliquely backwards, not reaching the posterior margin, while two median longitudinal bands are joined posteriorly in front of the base of the pronotum, diverge anteriorly, and extend to the anterior margin. The scutellum is yellow males (except for two small spots).
