= Philanthaxia pseudoaenea =

Scientific classification
- Kingdom: Animalia
- Phylum: Arthropoda
- Clade: Pancrustacea
- Class: Insecta
- Order: Coleoptera
- Suborder: Polyphaga
- Infraorder: Elateriformia
- Family: Buprestidae
- Genus: Philanthaxia
- Species: P. pseudoaenea

Binomial name
- Philanthaxia pseudoaenea Bílý & Nakládal, 2011

Species of beetle

Philanthaxia pseudoaenea is a species of beetle that was discovered in Thailand in July 2011.
