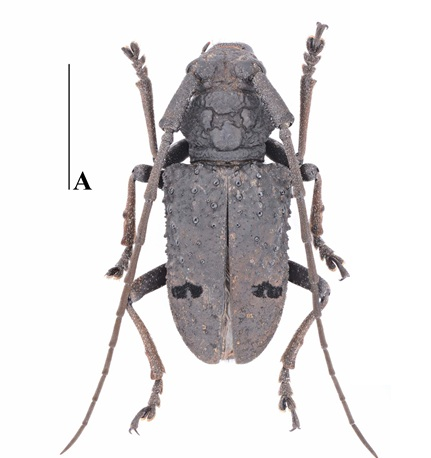

Scientific classification
- Kingdom: Animalia
- Phylum: Arthropoda
- Class: Insecta
- Order: Coleoptera
- Suborder: Polyphaga
- Infraorder: Cucujiformia
- Family: Cerambycidae
- Genus: Trachystolodes
- Species: T. huangjianbini

Binomial name
- Trachystolodes huangjianbini Huang, Guo & Liu, 2020

= Trachystolodes huangjianbini =

Species of beetle

Trachystolodes huangjianbini is a species of beetle of the Cerambycidae family. This species is found in China (Fujian, Jiangxi).
