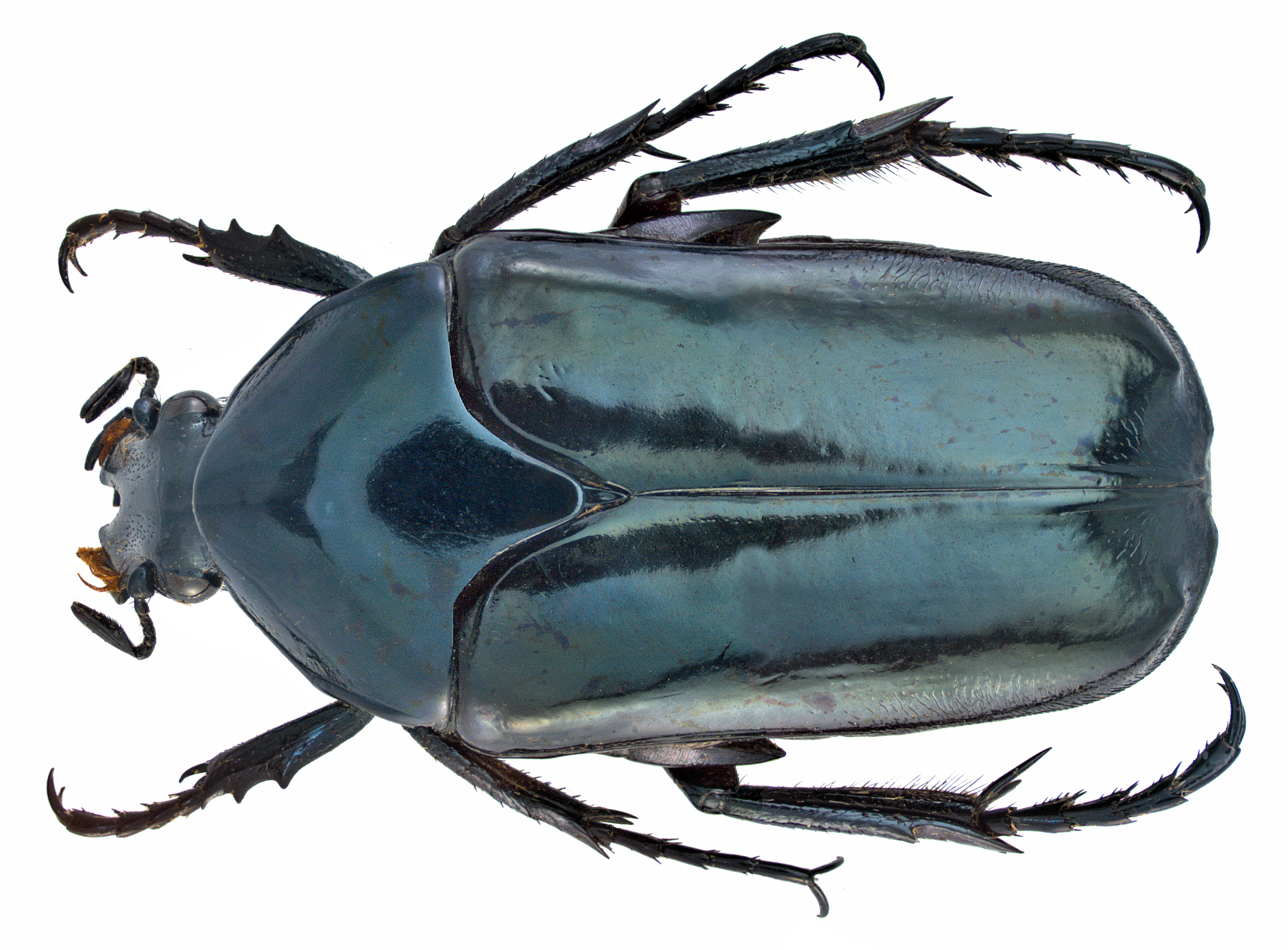

Scientific classification
- Kingdom: Animalia
- Phylum: Arthropoda
- Clade: Pancrustacea
- Class: Insecta
- Order: Coleoptera
- Suborder: Polyphaga
- Infraorder: Scarabaeiformia
- Family: Scarabaeidae
- Genus: Thaumastopeus
- Species: T. nigritus

Binomial name
- Thaumastopeus nigritus Frölich, 1792

Synonyms
- Cetonia nigrita Frölich, 1792 nec Fabricius, 1775; Macronota anthracina Wiedemann, 1823; Thaumastopeus simillimus Kraatz, 1898; Lomaptera viridiaenea Gory & Percheron, 1833

= Thaumastopeus nigritus =

Species of beetle

Thaumastopeus nigritus is a species of scarab beetle belonging to subfamily Cetoniinae.

== Taxonomy ==
This species was first described in 1792 by Josef Aloys Frölich under the name Cetonia nigrita. This species has two subspecies:

- Thaumastopeus nigritus nigritus (Frölich, 1792)
- Thaumastopeus nigritus nigroaeneus (Waterhouse, 1841)

== Morphology ==
A beetle with a body 27 to 28 mm long, quite flattened, and elongated in outline. The cuticle of the entire body is naked, shiny and black. The head has a long, deeply cut clypeus with sharp angles and a coarsely spotted surface. The pronotum has finely punctate lateral parts. The surface of the elytra is very smooth and slightly wrinkled on the sides and top. The mesosternum has a narrow interiliac, narrowing anteriorly. The sternum is slender and curved.

== Distribution ==
An insect belonging to the Indomalaya, distributed from southern China, mainland India, Nicobar Islands, Myanmar, Laos, Thailand, Malaysia, Philippines and Indonesia (including Java).
