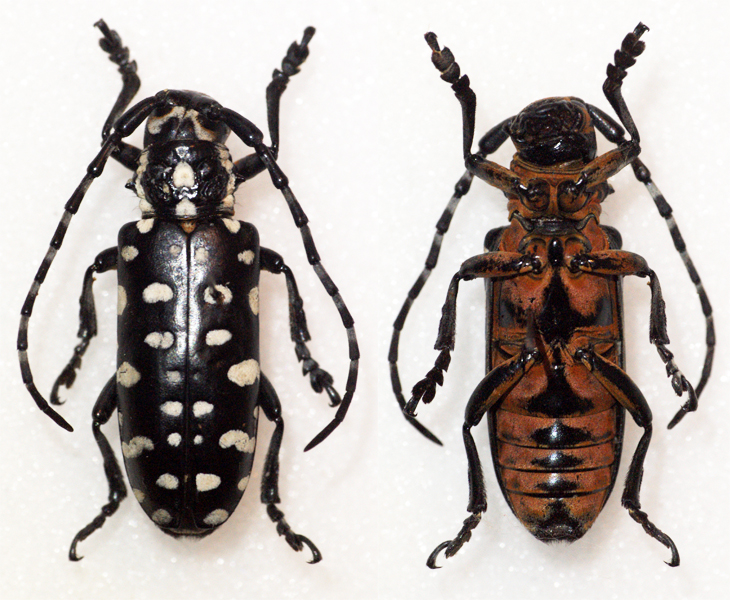

Scientific classification
- Domain: Eukaryota
- Kingdom: Animalia
- Phylum: Arthropoda
- Class: Insecta
- Order: Coleoptera
- Suborder: Polyphaga
- Infraorder: Cucujiformia
- Family: Cerambycidae
- Genus: Trenetica
- Species: T. lacrymans

Binomial name
- Trenetica lacrymans (Thomson, 1864)

= Trenetica =

Genus of beetles

Trenetica lacrymans is a species of beetle in the family Cerambycidae, and the only species in the genus Trenetica. It was described by Thomson in 1864.
