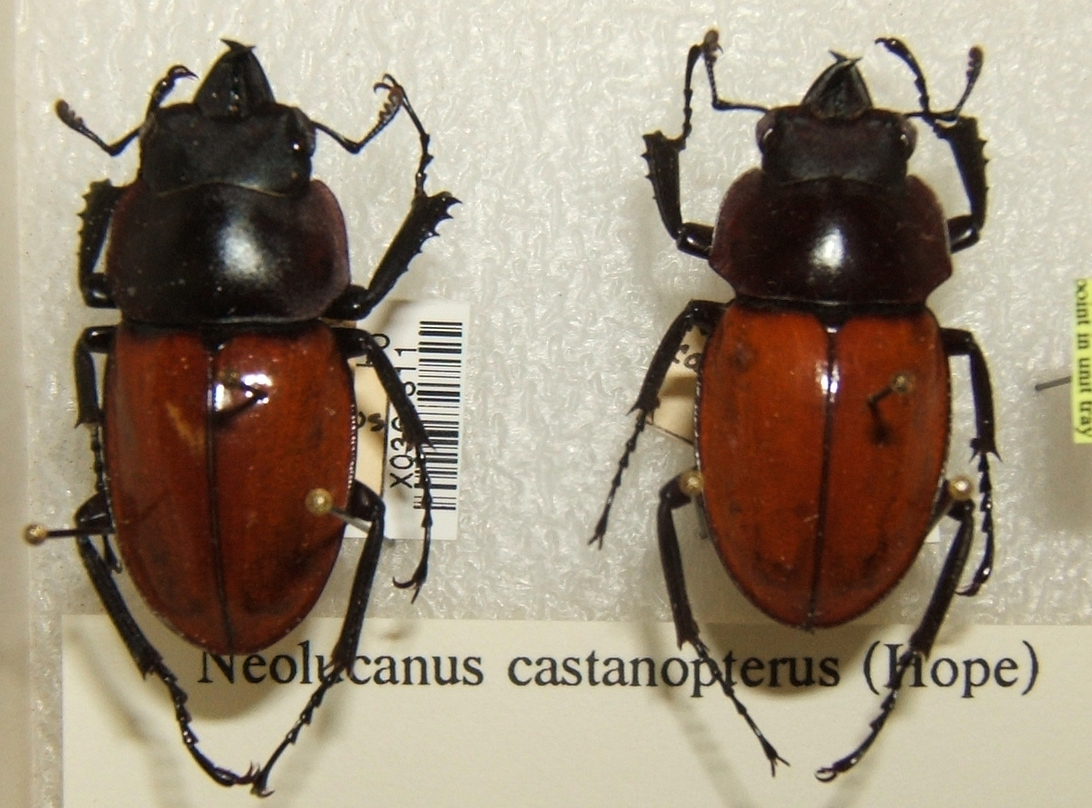
- Neolucanus castanopterus, adult

Scientific classification
- Kingdom: Animalia
- Phylum: Arthropoda
- Class: Insecta
- Order: Coleoptera
- Suborder: Polyphaga
- Infraorder: Scarabaeiformia
- Family: Lucanidae
- Genus: Neolucanus
- Species: N. castanopterus

Binomial name
- Neolucanus castanopterus Hope, 1831

= Neolucanus castanopterus =

Species of beetle

Neolucanus castanopterus is a beetle of the family Lucanidae. It is found in south and southeast Asia, including India and Thailand.
