= Spinaristobia =

Scientific classification
- Kingdom: Animalia
- Phylum: Arthropoda
- Class: Insecta
- Order: Coleoptera
- Suborder: Polyphaga
- Infraorder: Cucujiformia
- Family: Cerambycidae
- Genus: Spinaristobia
- Species: S. rondoni

Binomial name
- Spinaristobia rondoni Breuning, 1963

Genus of beetles

Spinaristobia rondoni is a species of beetle in the family Cerambycidae, and the only species in the genus Spinaristobia. It was described by Stephan von Breuning in 1963.
