= Stegenagapanthia albovittata =

Scientific classification
- Kingdom: Animalia
- Phylum: Arthropoda
- Class: Insecta
- Order: Coleoptera
- Suborder: Polyphaga
- Infraorder: Cucujiformia
- Family: Cerambycidae
- Genus: Stegenagapanthia
- Species: S. albovittata

Binomial name
- Stegenagapanthia albovittata Pic, 1924

Species of beetle

Stegenagapanthia albovittata is a species of beetle in the family Cerambycidae. It was described by Maurice Pic in 1924.
