= Trachystolodes tonkinensis =

Scientific classification
- Kingdom: Animalia
- Phylum: Arthropoda
- Class: Insecta
- Order: Coleoptera
- Suborder: Polyphaga
- Infraorder: Cucujiformia
- Family: Cerambycidae
- Genus: Trachystolodes
- Species: T. tonkinensis

Binomial name
- Trachystolodes tonkinensis Breuning, 1936

Species of beetle

Trachystolodes tonkinensis is a species of beetle in the family Cerambycidae. It was described by Stephan von Breuning in 1936. It is known from Laos, China, and Vietnam. It contains the varietas Trachystolodes tonkinensis var. pici.
