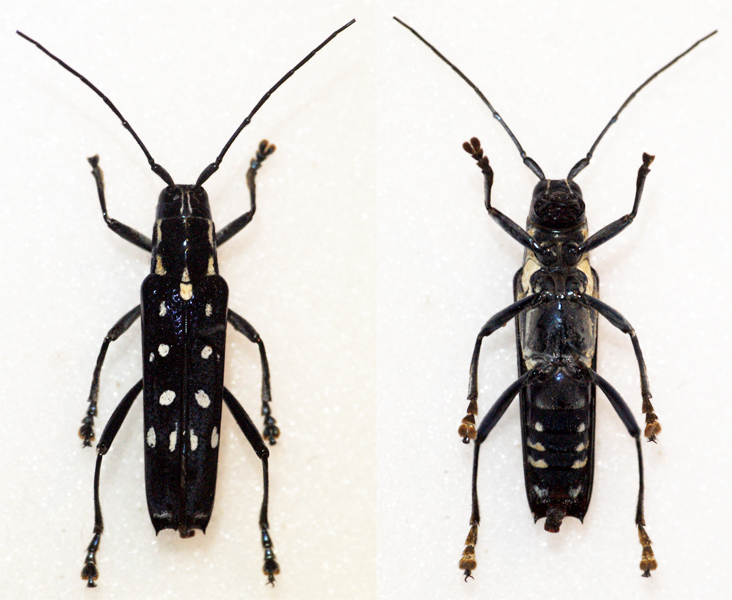

Scientific classification
- Kingdom: Animalia
- Phylum: Arthropoda
- Clade: Pancrustacea
- Class: Insecta
- Order: Coleoptera
- Suborder: Polyphaga
- Infraorder: Cucujiformia
- Family: Cerambycidae
- Genus: Glenea
- Species: G. elegans

Binomial name
- Glenea elegans (Olivier, 1795)

Synonyms
- Colobothea picta (Fabricius) Laporte de Castelnau, 1840; Glenea chalybaea (Illiger) Ritsema, 1892; Glenea picta (Fabricius) Pascoe, 1867; Saperda chalybaea Illiger, 1800; Sphenura elegans (Olivier) Heyne-Taschenberg, 1906; Stenocorus pictus Fabricius, 1801; Saperda elegans Olivier, 1795

= Glenea elegans =

Species of beetle

Glenea elegans is a species of beetle in the family Cerambycidae. It was described by Guillaume-Antoine Olivier in 1795, originally under the genus Saperda. It is known from Malaysia, Thailand, Sumatra, and Java.

== Varietas ==
- Glenea elegans var. affinis Ritsema, 1892
- Glenea elegans var. clytia Thomson, 1879
- Glenea elegans var. delia Thomson, 1860
