= Glycosia tricolor =

Scientific classification
- Kingdom: Animalia
- Phylum: Arthropoda
- Clade: Pancrustacea
- Class: Insecta
- Order: Coleoptera
- Suborder: Polyphaga
- Infraorder: Scarabaeiformia
- Family: Scarabaeidae
- Genus: Glycosia
- Species: G. tricolor

Binomial name
- Glycosia tricolor (Olivier, 1789)

Synonyms
- Cetonia tricolor Olivier, 1789; Glycosia plagiata Schoch, 1896; Glycosia tricolor nagpurensis Arrow, 1910

Species of beetle

Glycosia tricolor is a species of flower chafer native to India, Sri Lanka and Thailand.

== Description ==
The average length of the adult beetle is about 2.7 cm.

== Species ==
Nine subspecies have been identified.

- Glycosia tricolor baliensis Jakl, 2009
- Glycosia tricolor carthausi (Flach, 1890)
- Glycosia tricolor latipennis Sakai, 1995
- Glycosia tricolor lombokiana Jakl, 2018
- Glycosia tricolor malesiana Pavicevic, 1984
- Glycosia tricolor palliata (Mohnike, 1871)
- Glycosia tricolor siberutensis Sakai, 1995
- Glycosia tricolor tricolor Olivier, 1789
- Glycosia tricolor vietnamica Miksic, 1982
