= Stegenagapanthia =

Scientific classification
- Kingdom: Animalia
- Phylum: Arthropoda
- Class: Insecta
- Order: Coleoptera
- Suborder: Polyphaga
- Infraorder: Cucujiformia
- Family: Cerambycidae
- Tribe: Lamiini
- Genus: Stegenagapanthia

Genus of beetles

Stegenagapanthia is a genus of longhorn beetles of the subfamily Lamiinae, containing the following species:

- Stegenagapanthia albovittata Pic, 1924
- Stegenagapanthia nivalis Holzschuh, 2007
