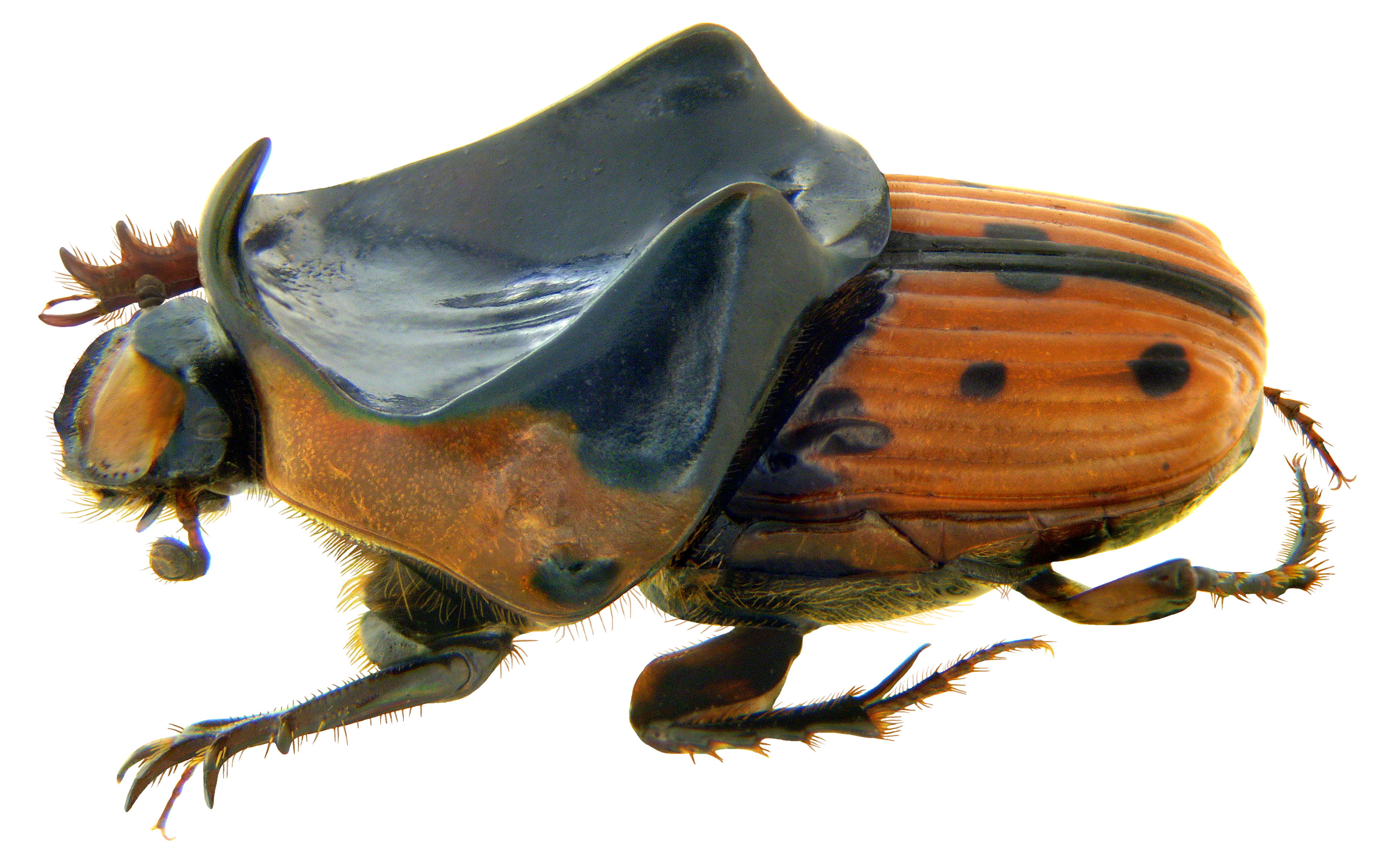

Scientific classification
- Kingdom: Animalia
- Phylum: Arthropoda
- Clade: Pancrustacea
- Class: Insecta
- Order: Coleoptera
- Suborder: Polyphaga
- Infraorder: Scarabaeiformia
- Family: Scarabaeidae
- Genus: Liatongus
- Species: L. rhadamistus

Binomial name
- Liatongus rhadamistus (Fabricius, 1775)

Synonyms
- Scaptodera rhadamistus MacLeay, 1821

= Liatongus rhadamistus =

Species of beetle

Liatongus rhadamistus, or Scaptodera rhadamistus, is a species of dung beetle found in India, Sri Lanka, Laos and Thailand.

== Description ==
This elongate-oval, little flattened species has an average length of about 11 to 15 mm. Body bright orange-yellow in color. Head, pronotum, basal aid sutural margins of the elytra are bluish or greenish-black in color. There is a greenish-black spot common to both elytra upon the middle of the suture. Pygidium posterior, the sterna, abdomen, tibiae and tarsi are dark green in color. A slight metallic golden lustre found at the sides of the pronotum. Head almost semicircular with a flattened rhomboidal area between the eyes. Elytra deeply striate, with the striae very indistinctly punctured. Pygidium finely distinctly punctured. Male has rosy-golden clypeus which is lightly punctured. There is a deep excavation extending almost for its entire length. But female has transversely rugose head with a slight median tubercle.

Male has yellowish-orange body with metallic green patches. Clypeus metallic green, with black lateral margins. Antenna with eight segments. Male genitalia consists of parameres and phallobase. Female has yellowish-orange and oval body. Head with dark metallic green clypeus. There is a central metallic green patch.

== Biology ==
Adults construct brood ball nest in cow dung pats with an average diameter of 25 to 30 cm. Each nest contains with 3 to 7 brood balls per brood chamber which is guarded by the female. Eggs are lemon yellow in color which are oblong, with an average length of 4.5 ± 0.1 mm. Eggs are followed by three instar larval grub stages. Third instar is translucent in appearance where the body is covered with very fine setae. There is a humped in the middle giving a V-shaped appearance to the body. Average length of the grub is about 19 ± 0.20 mm. Clypeus wider than long, and is rectangular in shape. Antennae with four segments. Exarate pupa has transverse pronotum with rounded margins. There are four thumb-like tergal support projections. But the pronotal support projection is absent. Caudal projection is callus-like in shape.
