= Trachystolodes =

Scientific classification
- Kingdom: Animalia
- Phylum: Arthropoda
- Class: Insecta
- Order: Coleoptera
- Suborder: Polyphaga
- Infraorder: Cucujiformia
- Family: Cerambycidae
- Tribe: Lamiini
- Genus: Trachystolodes

Genus of beetles

Trachystolodes is a genus of longhorn beetles of the subfamily Lamiinae, containing the following species:

- Trachystolodes bimaculatus (Kriesche, 1924)
- Trachystolodes huangjianbini Huang & Guo & Liu, 2020
- Trachystolodes tianjialini Wang, Xie & Wang, 2021
- Trachystolodes tonkinensis Breuning, 1936
