= Glenea aeolis =

Scientific classification
- Kingdom: Animalia
- Phylum: Arthropoda
- Clade: Pancrustacea
- Class: Insecta
- Order: Coleoptera
- Suborder: Polyphaga
- Infraorder: Cucujiformia
- Family: Cerambycidae
- Genus: Glenea
- Species: G. aeolis

Binomial name
- Glenea aeolis Thomson, 1879

Species of beetle

Glenea aeolis is a species of beetle in the family Cerambycidae. It was described by James Thomson in 1879. It is known from Laos, Java, and Myanmar.

== Subspecies ==
- Glenea aeolis aeolis Thomson, 1879
- Glenea aeolis laosica Breuning, 1963
- Glenea aeolis reductemaculipennis Gilmour & Breuning, 1963
