= Acalolepta pseudospeciosa =

Scientific classification
- Kingdom: Animalia
- Phylum: Arthropoda
- Class: Insecta
- Order: Coleoptera
- Suborder: Polyphaga
- Infraorder: Cucujiformia
- Family: Cerambycidae
- Genus: Acalolepta
- Species: A. pseudospeciosa

Binomial name
- Acalolepta pseudospeciosa Breuning, 1964

Species of beetle

Acalolepta pseudospeciosa is a species of beetle in the family Cerambycidae. It was described by Stephan von Breuning in 1964. It is known from Vietnam and Laos.
