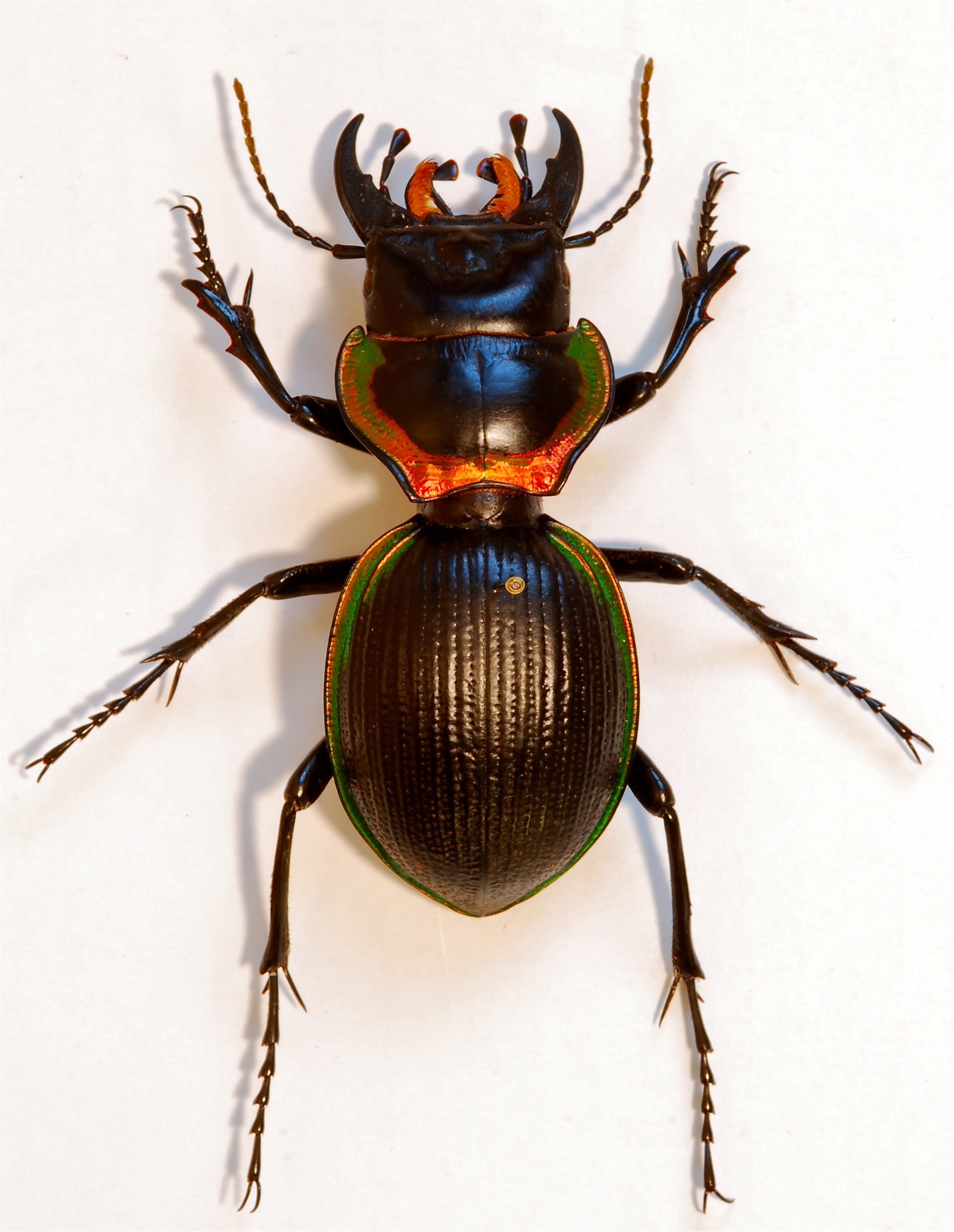
- Mouhotia gloriosa

Scientific classification
- Domain: Eukaryota
- Kingdom: Animalia
- Phylum: Arthropoda
- Class: Insecta
- Order: Coleoptera
- Suborder: Adephaga
- Family: Carabidae
- Subfamily: Scaritinae
- Tribe: Scaritini
- Subtribe: Carenina
- Genus: Mouhotia; Laporte, 1862

Synonyms
- Scaritarchus Schaum, 1863

= Mouhotia =

Genus of beetles

Mouhotia is a genus in the ground beetle family Carabidae. There are at least three described species in Mouhotia.

== Species ==
These three species belong to the genus Mouhotia:

- Mouhotia batesi Lewis, 1879 (Myanmar, Thailand)
- Mouhotia convexa Lewis, 1883 (Thailand, Laos)
- Mouhotia gloriosa Laporte, 1862 (China, Thailand, Laos)
