= Philanthaxia =

Scientific classification
- Kingdom: Animalia
- Phylum: Arthropoda
- Class: Insecta
- Order: Coleoptera
- Suborder: Polyphaga
- Infraorder: Elateriformia
- Family: Buprestidae
- Subfamily: Buprestinae
- Tribe: Thomassetiini
- Genus: Philanthaxia; Deyrolle, 1864

Genus of beetles

Philanthaxia is a genus of beetles in the family Buprestidae, containing the following species:

- Philanthaxia acuminata Bílý, 1993
- Philanthaxia acuticollis Bílý, 2001
- Philanthaxia aenea (Saunders, 1866)
- Philanthaxia akiyamai Bílý, 1993
- Philanthaxia andamana Kerremans, 1888
- Philanthaxia aureoviridis Saunders, 1867
- Philanthaxia auricollis Kerremans, 1912
- Philanthaxia azurea Bílý, 2004
- Philanthaxia binhensis Bílý, 1997
- Philanthaxia cavifrons Bílý, 2004
- Philanthaxia ceylonica Tôyama in Bílý, 1993
- Philanthaxia convexifrons Kurosawa, 1954
- Philanthaxia cumingii (Waterhouse, 1887)
- Philanthaxia cupricauda Kerremans, 1895
- Philanthaxia cupricollis Tôyama in Bílý, 1993
- Philanthaxia curta Deyrolle, 1864
- Philanthaxia cyanescens Fisher, 1922
- Philanthaxia dorsalis Waterhouse, 1887
- Philanthaxia frontalis Bílý, 1993
- Philanthaxia hirtifrons Bílý, 2004
- Philanthaxia immaculata (Haupt, 1956)
- Philanthaxia indica Bílý, 1993
- Philanthaxia iriei Kurosawa, 1985
- Philanthaxia iris Obenberger, 1938
- Philanthaxia jakli Bílý & Nakládal, 2011
- Philanthaxia jendeki Bílý, 2001
- Philanthaxia kinabaluana Bílý, 1993
- Philanthaxia kubani Bílý, 2001
- Philanthaxia kwai Bílý, 1997
- Philanthaxia laosensis Baudon, 1966
- Philanthaxia lata Kerremans, 1914
- Philanthaxia longicornis Ni & Song, 2025
- Philanthaxia lui Ni & Song, 2025
- Philanthaxia lumawigi Bílý, 1993
- Philanthaxia merocratoides Bílý, 2004
- Philanthaxia nelsoni Bílý, 0006
- Philanthaxia nigra Théry, 1911
- Philanthaxia ohmomoi Bílý, 1993
- Philanthaxia ovata Bílý, 1993
- Philanthaxia parafrontalis Bílý, 1997
- Philanthaxia planifrons Bílý, 2004
- Philanthaxia pseudoaenea Bílý & Nakládal, 2011
- Philanthaxia pseudocupricauda Bílý, 1993
- Philanthaxia pseudofrontalis Bílý, 2004
- Philanthaxia purpuriceps (Saunders, 1866)
- Philanthaxia reticulata Bílý, 1997
- Philanthaxia robusta Bílý, 2004
- Philanthaxia rolciki Bílý, 2001
- Philanthaxia romblonica Bílý, 1997
- Philanthaxia rufimarginata (Saunders, 1866)
- Philanthaxia sadahiroi Bílý, 2004
- Philanthaxia sarawakensis Bílý, 1993
- Philanthaxia sauteri Kerremans, 1913
- Philanthaxia similis Bílý, 2001
- Philanthaxia simonae Bílý, 1983
- Philanthaxia splendida van de Poll, 1892
- Philanthaxia sumatrensis Bílý, 1993
- Philanthaxia tassii Baudon, 1968
- Philanthaxia thailandica Bílý, 1993
- Philanthaxia tonkinea Bílý, 1993
- Philanthaxia transwallacea Bílý, 2001
- Philanthaxia tricolor Bílý, 1993
- Philanthaxia vietnamica Bílý, 1993
- Philanthaxia viridiaurea Bílý, 1993
- Philanthaxia viridifrons Kerremans, 1912
