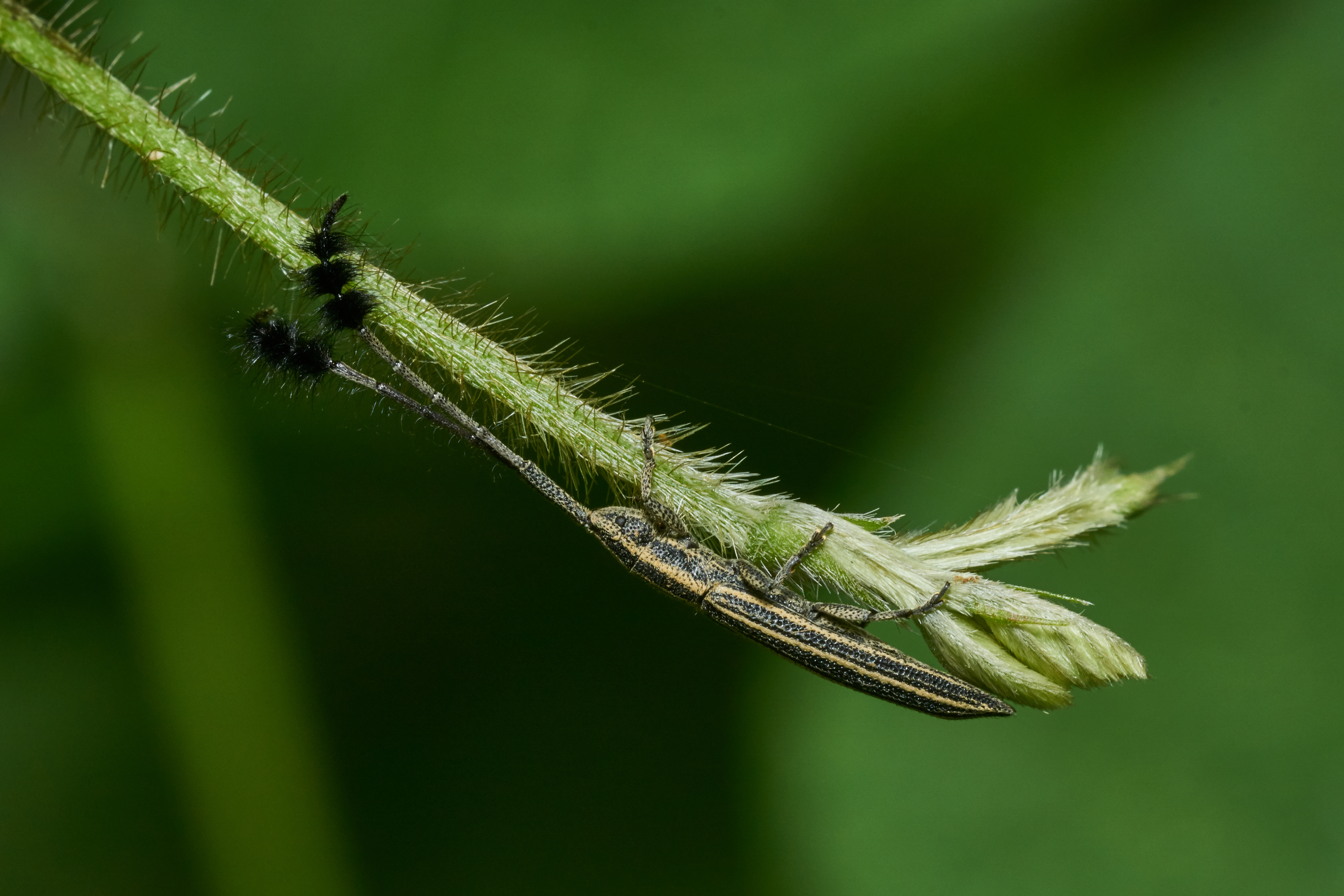
- Eucomatocera vittata

Scientific classification
- Domain: Eukaryota
- Kingdom: Animalia
- Phylum: Arthropoda
- Class: Insecta
- Order: Coleoptera
- Suborder: Polyphaga
- Infraorder: Cucujiformia
- Family: Cerambycidae
- Subfamily: Lamiinae
- Tribe: Agapanthiini
- Genus: Eucomatocera; White, 1846

= Eucomatocera =

Genus of beetles

Eucomatocera is an Asian genus of beetle in the family Cerambycidae and tribe Agapanthiini, described by White in 1846.

== Species ==
BioLib and GBIF include:

1. Eucomatocera minuta Pu, 1988
2. Eucomatocera vittata White, 1846 - type species
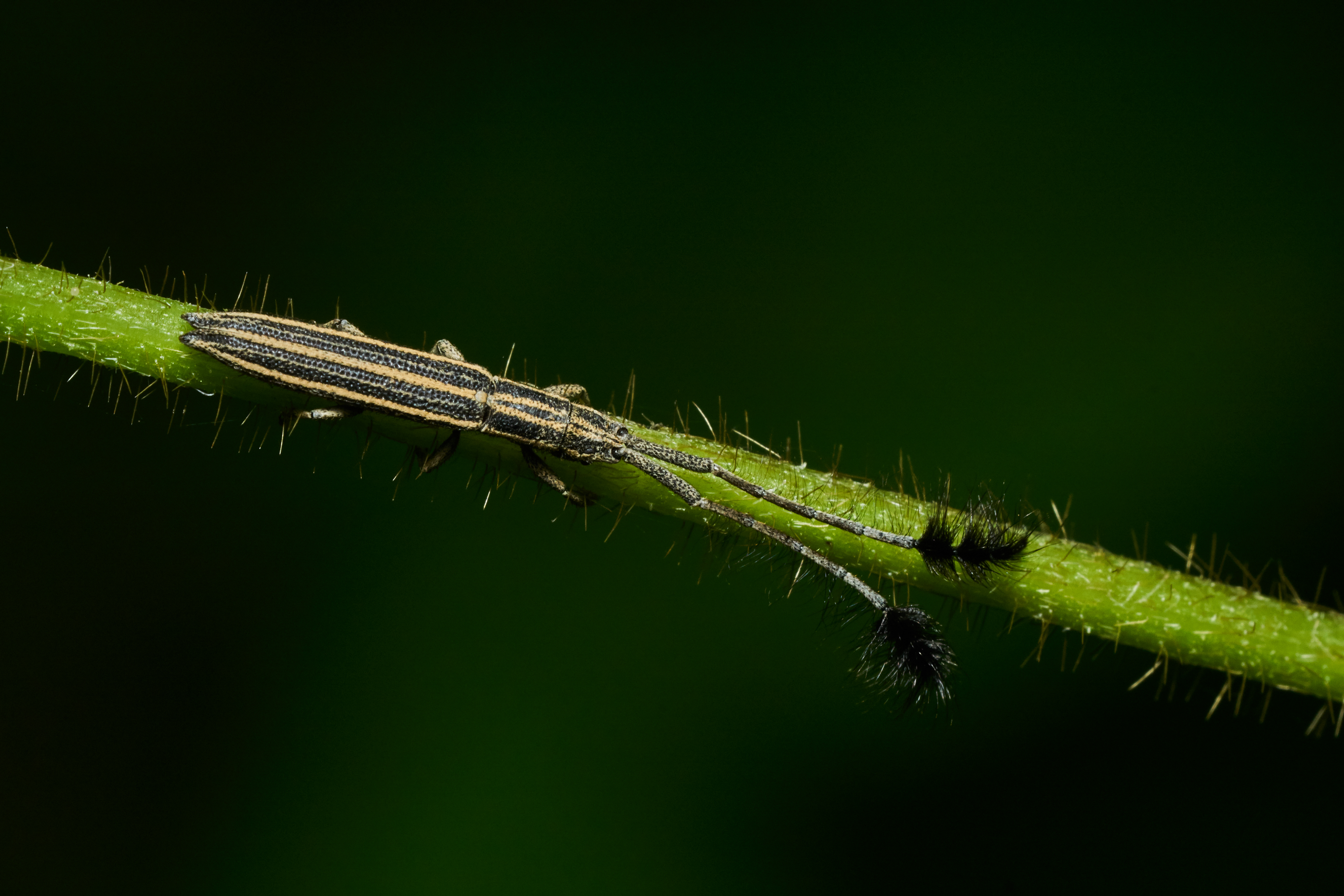
Dorsal view

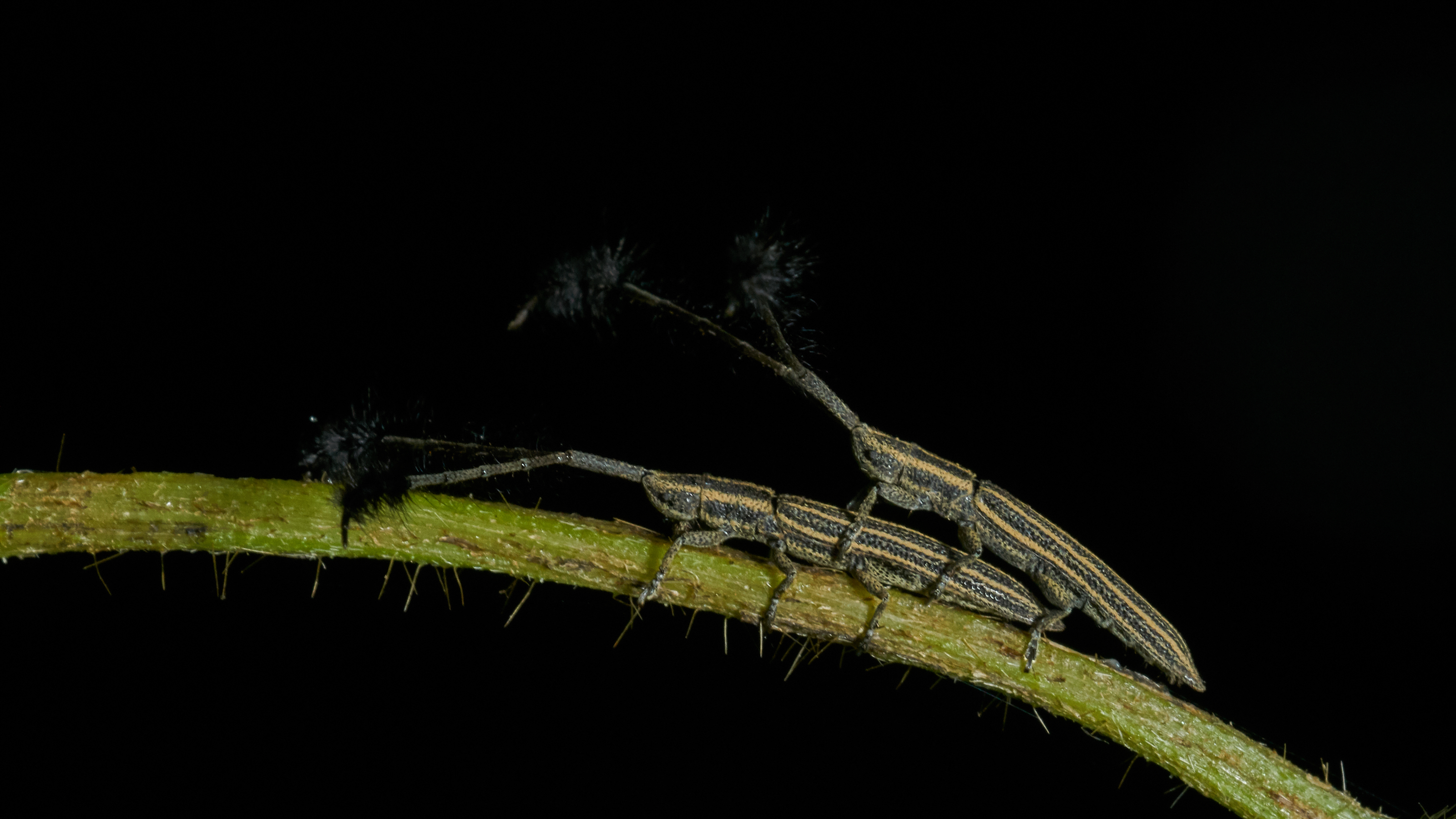
Mating pair
