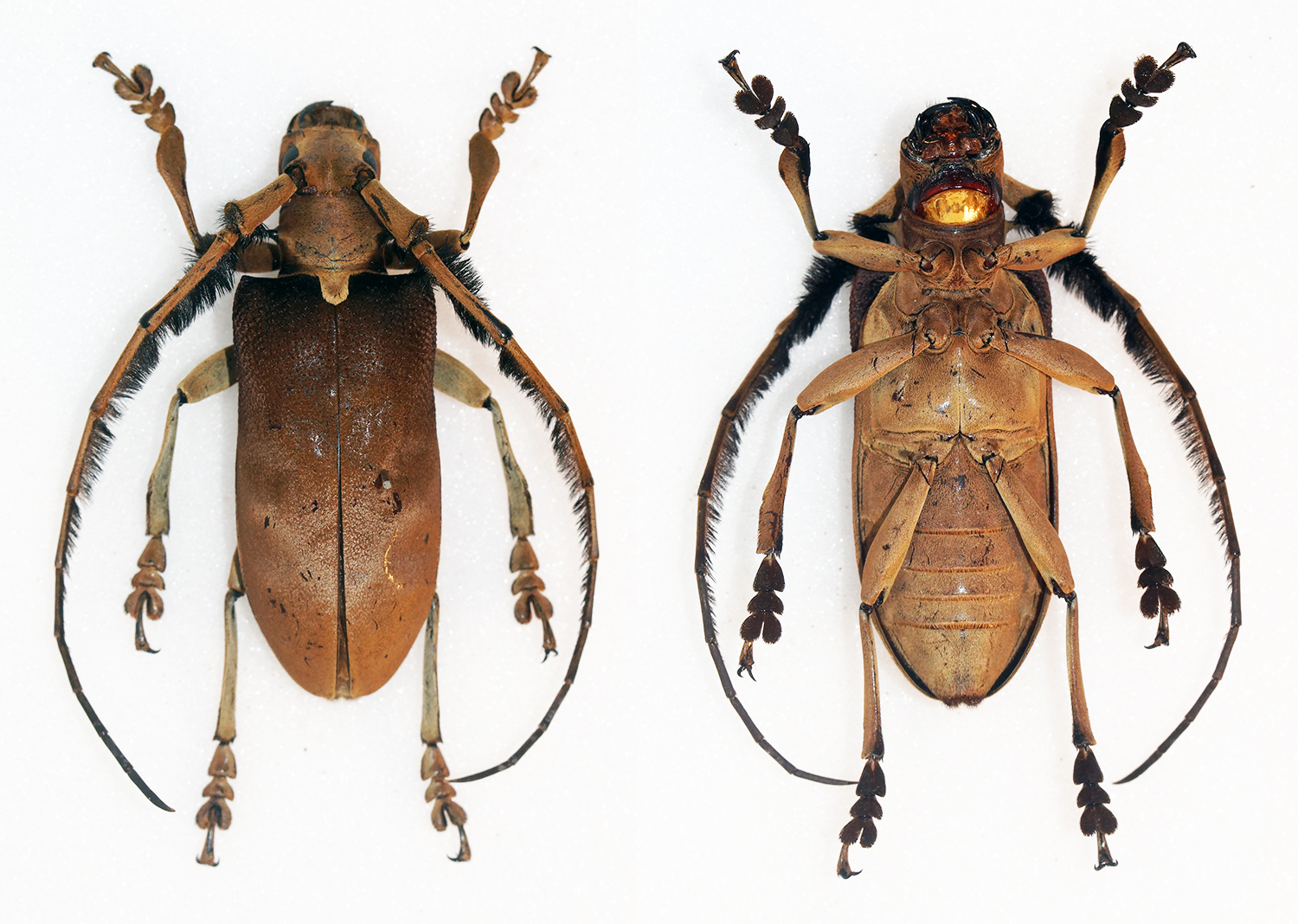

Scientific classification
- Kingdom: Animalia
- Phylum: Arthropoda
- Class: Insecta
- Order: Coleoptera
- Suborder: Polyphaga
- Infraorder: Cucujiformia
- Family: Cerambycidae
- Genus: Sarothrocera
- Species: S. lowii

Binomial name
- Sarothrocera lowii White, 1846

= Sarothrocera =

Genus of beetles

Sarothrocera lowii is a species of beetle in the family Cerambycidae, and the only species in the genus Sarothrocera. It was described by White in 1846.
