= Glenea proserpina =

Scientific classification
- Kingdom: Animalia
- Phylum: Arthropoda
- Clade: Pancrustacea
- Class: Insecta
- Order: Coleoptera
- Suborder: Polyphaga
- Infraorder: Cucujiformia
- Family: Cerambycidae
- Genus: Glenea
- Species: G. proserpina

Binomial name
- Glenea proserpina J. Thomson, 1865

Synonyms
- Glenea nympha Kuntzen, 1914 nec Thomson, 1865

Species of beetle

Glenea proserpina is a species of beetle in the family Cerambycidae. It was described by James Thomson in 1865. It is known from Laos, Sumatra, Malaysia and Borneo.

== Varietas ==
- Glenea proserpina var. honora Pascoe, 1867
- Glenea proserpina var. sutureindicata Breuning, 1956
