= Antennohyllisia =

Scientific classification
- Kingdom: Animalia
- Phylum: Arthropoda
- Class: Insecta
- Order: Coleoptera
- Suborder: Polyphaga
- Infraorder: Cucujiformia
- Family: Cerambycidae
- Genus: Antennohyllisia
- Species: A. rondoni

Binomial name
- Antennohyllisia rondoni Breuning, 1963

Genus of beetles

Antennohyllisia rondoni is a species of beetle in the family Cerambycidae, and the only species in the genus Antennohyllisia. It was described by Breuning in 1963. The species is 6–8 millimetres (0.24–0.31 in) long and is endemic to Paksane District, Laos.
