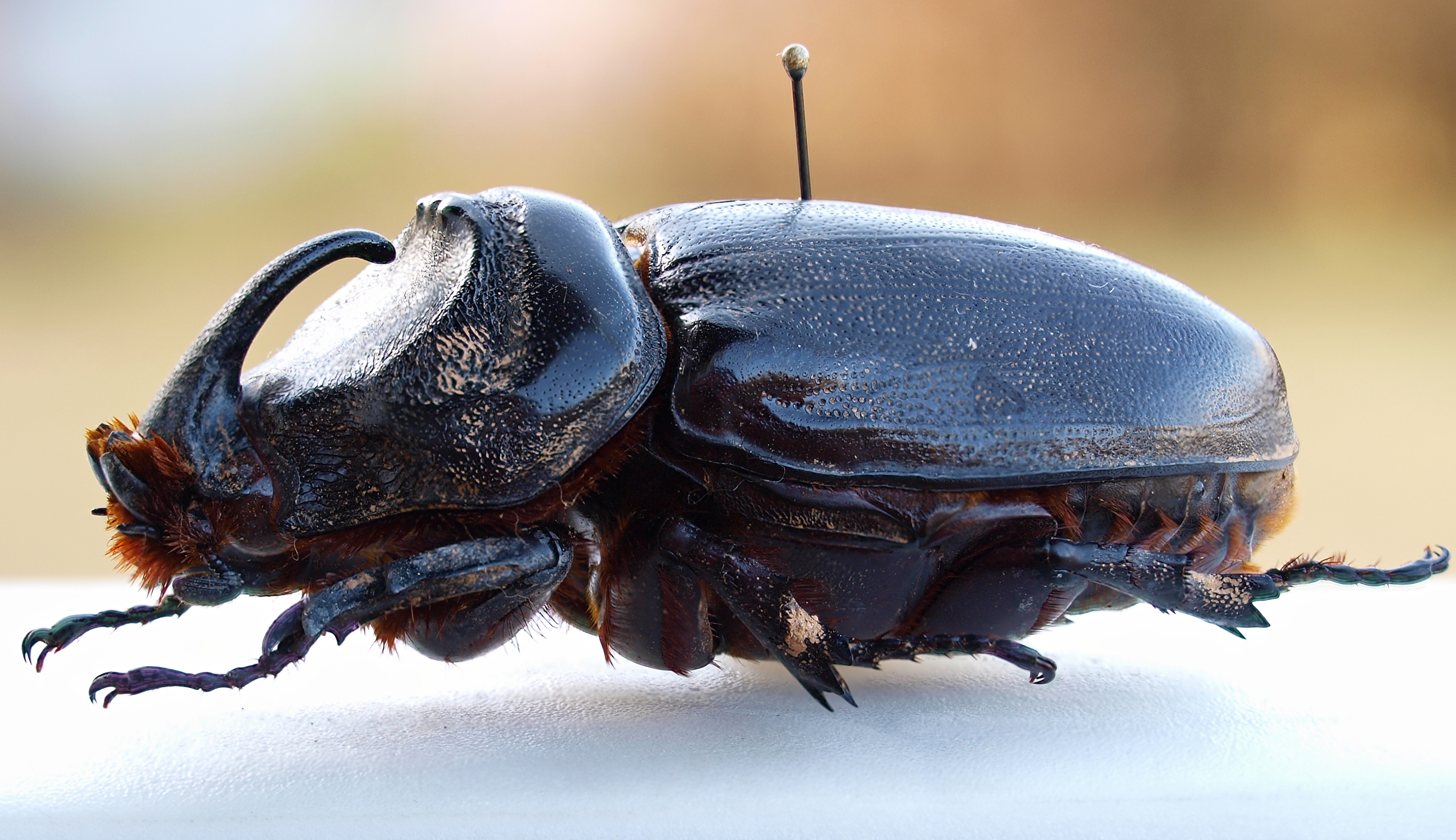
- male
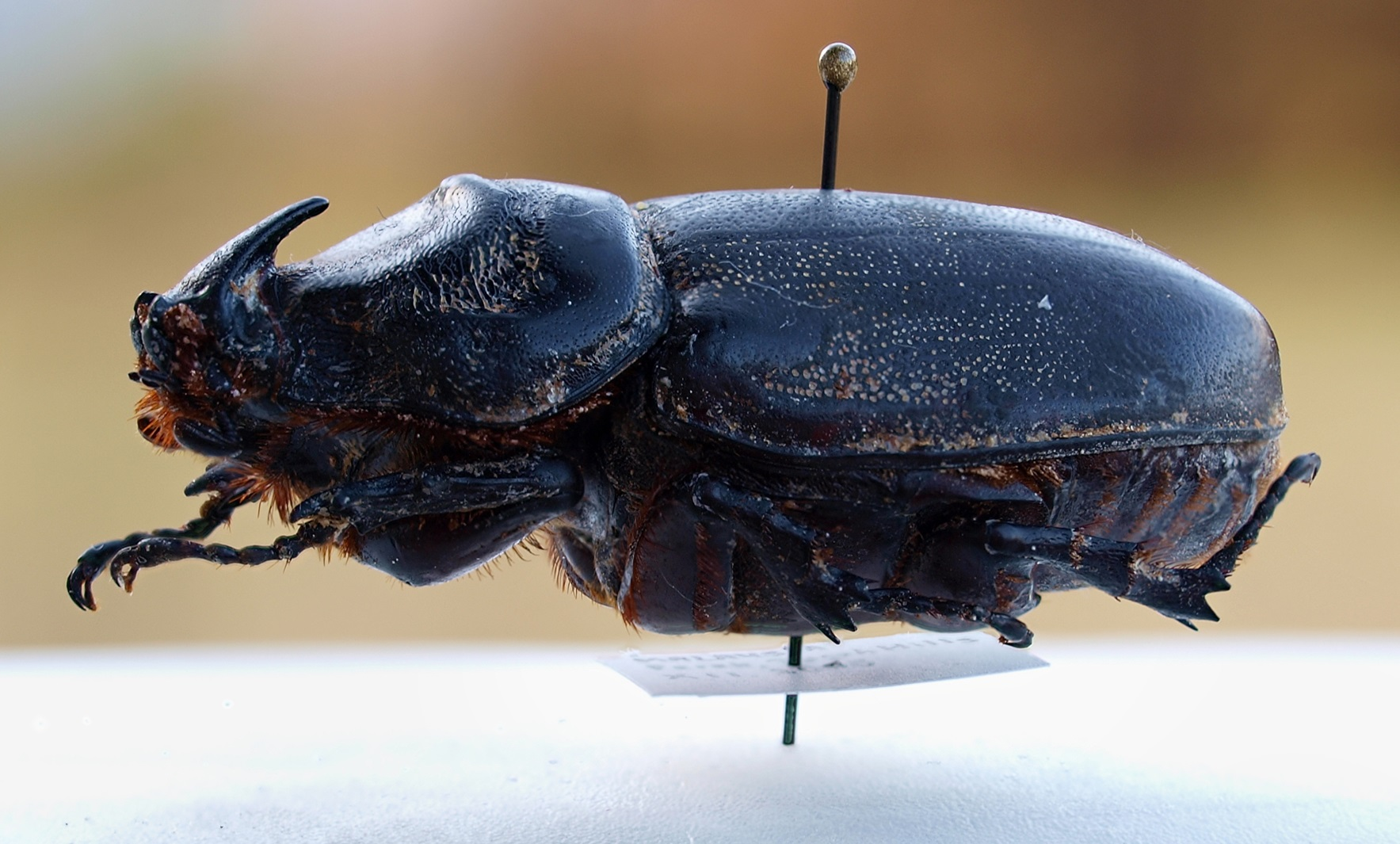
- female

Scientific classification
- Kingdom: Animalia
- Phylum: Arthropoda
- Clade: Pancrustacea
- Class: Insecta
- Order: Coleoptera
- Suborder: Polyphaga
- Infraorder: Scarabaeiformia
- Family: Scarabaeidae
- Subfamily: Dynastinae
- Tribe: Oryctini
- Genus: Oryctes
- Species: O. gnu

Binomial name
- Oryctes gnu Mohnike, 1874

Synonyms
- Oryctes trituberculatus van Lansberge, 1879

= Oryctes gnu =

Species of beetle

Oryctes gnu, commonly known as Malaysian rhinoceros beetle, is a species of rhinoceros beetles from the subfamily Dynastinae (family: Scarabaeidae) in Southeast Asia and Sri Lanka. It is a large (usually > 50 mm), brown to black and broadly-built species, with similarities to the smaller (usually < 50 mm) coconut rhinoceros beetle (Oryctes rhinoceros). Apart from the difference in size, both species can be easily separated by the shape of the pronotum. In O. gnu the depression (concavity) on the pronotum is larger with 3 knobs or tubercles at its hind margin. O. rhinoceros has only 2 knobs. Unlike O. rhinoceros, a well known pest of coconut palms, O. gnu is uncommon and has been rarely cited as an agricultural pest.

== Distribution ==
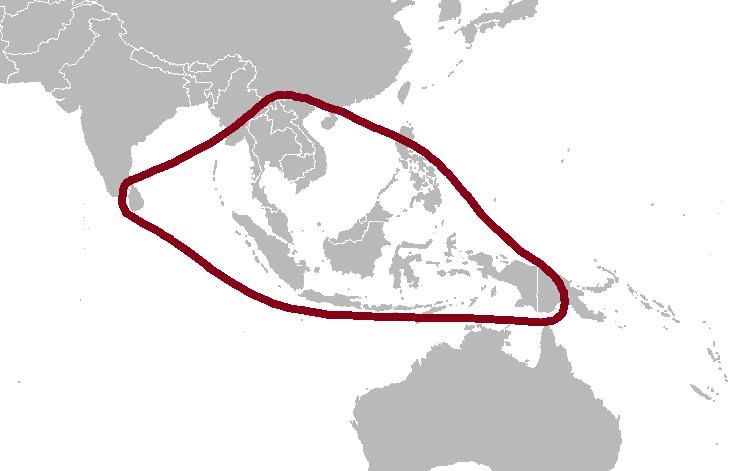
Distribution range of Oryctes gnu in southern Asia

Oryctes gnu has been originally described from the island of Luzon in the Philippines, but subsequently it has been also reported from as far west as Sri Lanka and as far south as New Guinea. However, most records are from Southeast Asia, especially from Malaysia, Indonesia and Thailand. In addition, O. gnu has been recorded in Hainan Island (southern China), Cambodia and Laos. The type localities of Oryctes trituberculatus, a synonym of Oryctes gnu, has been given as the Indonesian islands of Sumatra and Celebes (= Sulawesi).

== Description ==
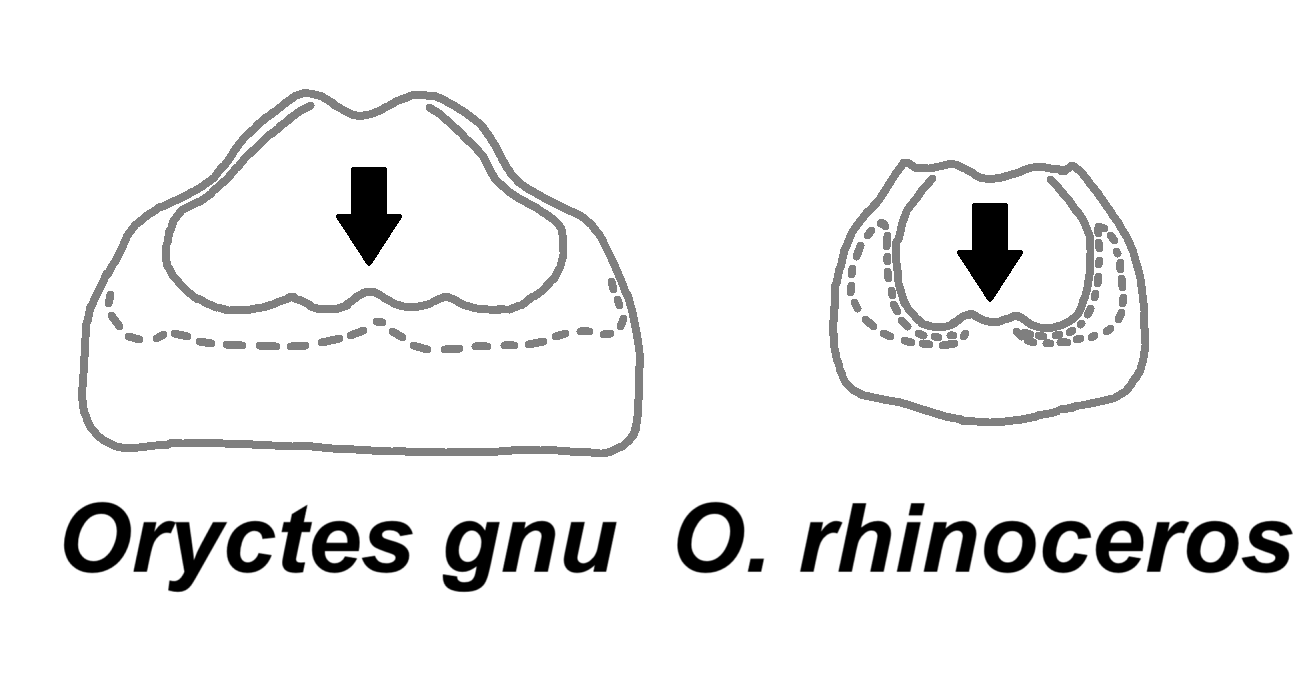
Pronotum of average-sized male Oryctes gnu (left) compared to that of a male Oryctes rhinoceros (right), arrows point to knobs (tubercles) at the hind margin of the depression (concavity)

Oryctes gnu is one of the largest species of Oryctes and is usually larger than 50 mm. In his taxonomic review of Oryctes species, Sebö Endrödi gives the length as 54–65 mm for 9 examined specimens. O. gnu can be confused with Oryctes rhinoceros, a species with a similar distribution range. Both species belong to the subgenus Rykanes which is characterized by the end of the hind tibia having only 2 fixed spikes. This similarity has been already noted in the original description of O. gnu as well as that of O. trituberculatus, a synonym of O. gnu, and by various other authors. However, O. rhinoceros is smaller, usually less than 50 mm long, narrower and males of both species can be readily separated by the shape of the pronotum. In O. gnu the depression (concavity) on the pronotum is very large, broad and has 3 knobs (tubercles) on its hind margin. The depression is smaller and narrower in O. rhinoceros with only 2 knobs, see the arrows in the illustration on the right side.

The head of Oryctes gnu has a long horn (longer than in O. rhinoceros) which is strongly curved backwards at the tip. In the diameter, the horn is compressed laterally, but in O. rhinoceros it is compressed in the anterior-posterior direction. The clypeus of O. gnu is very broad with a central deep indent that reaches the horn. Its corners are narrow, almost thorn-like. The elytra are longer than their combined width (about 35:30). Their surface is covered with many pits which also form several double rows. In males, the last abdominal segment, the pygidium, is rounded with no hair on its dorsal side and few, fine hairs on its ventral side. In females, the pygidium is more pointed and covered with short hair.

== Biology ==
There seems to be almost nothing known about the biology of Oryctes gnu. In Indonesia and Malaysia, it appears to be an occasional pest of coconut and oil palms with a similar biology as the well-known Oryctes rhinoceros, judging from the fact that it has been cited in books and reviews of palm pests. However, no details are provided in these reviews, apart from pointing out the morphological similarities and differences between both species.
