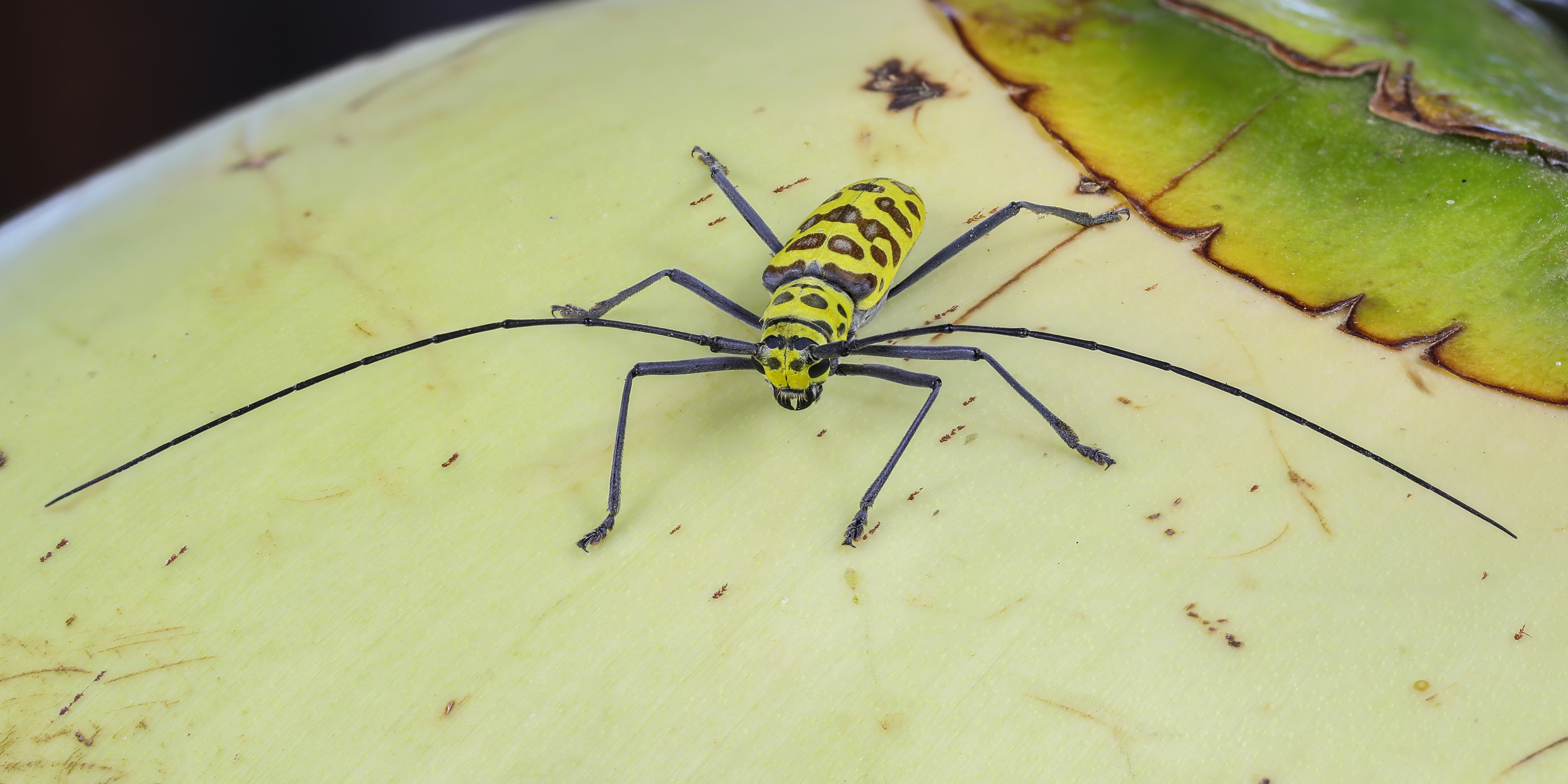

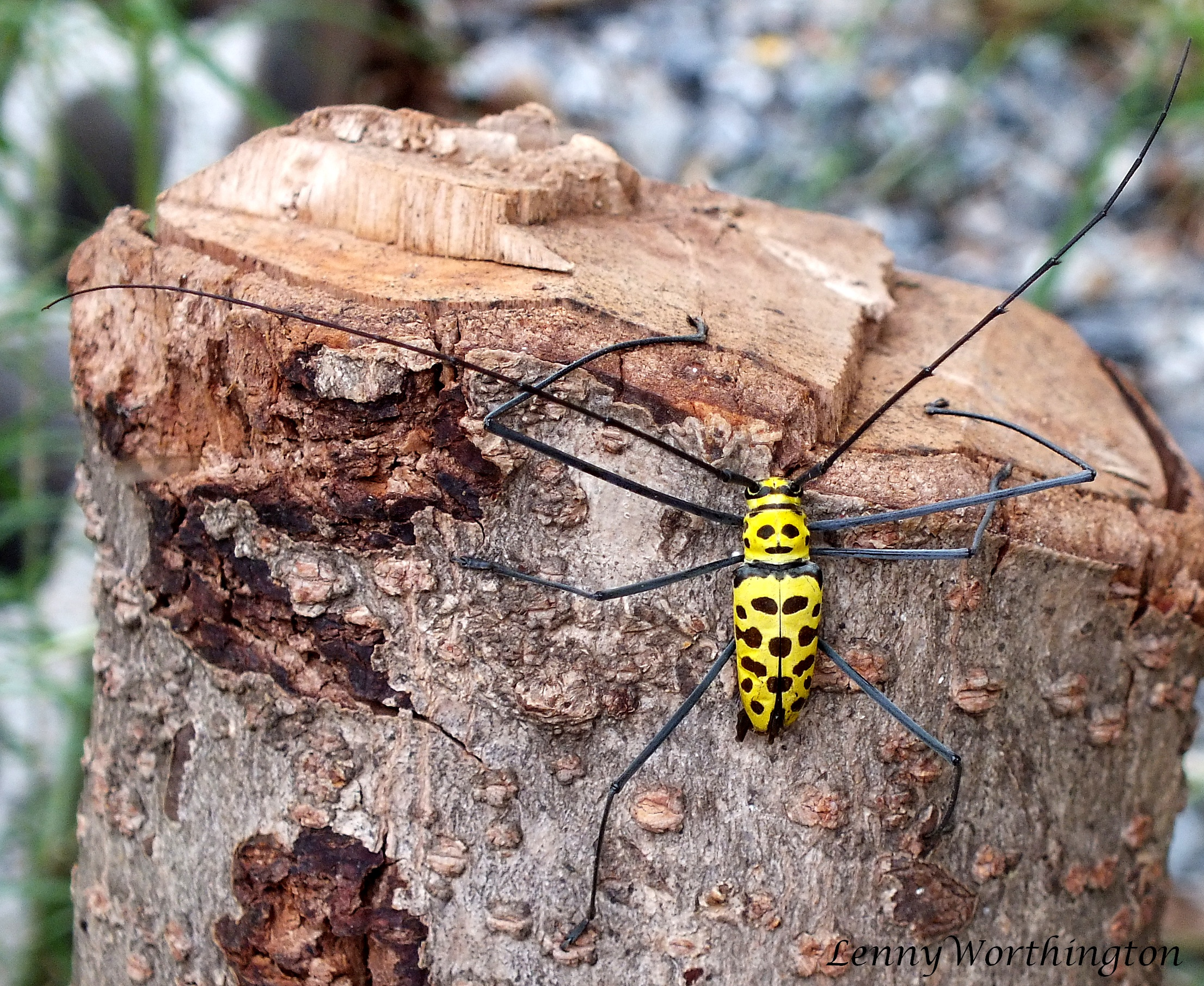

Scientific classification
- Kingdom: Animalia
- Phylum: Arthropoda
- Clade: Pancrustacea
- Class: Insecta
- Order: Coleoptera
- Suborder: Polyphaga
- Infraorder: Cucujiformia
- Family: Cerambycidae
- Subfamily: Lamiinae
- Tribe: Lamiini
- Genus: Gerania; Audinet-Serville, 1835
- Species: G. bosci

Binomial name
- Gerania bosci (Fabricius, 1801)

Synonyms
- Leptura longipes Voet, 1806; Padia bosci (Fabricius) Gistel, 1848; Saperda bosci Fabricius, 1801

= Gerania bosci =

Genus of beetles

Gerania bosci is an Asian species of flat-faced longhorn beetle in the subfamily Lamiinae. It is the only species in the genus Gerania (Audinet-Serville, 1835).

== Description ==
Gerania bosci can reach a length of about 70–80 millimetres (2.8–3.1 in) and a width (including antenna) of about 60 millimetres (2.4 in). The body coloration is quite variable. Usually the background ranges from bright yellow to almost white, with large brown or black spots and markings and bluish-black legs. This species has unusually long legs, almost spider-like, making it distinctive, and popular among collectors. The males are larger than females and have elongated appendages.

== Distribution and habitat ==
This species can be found in mixed forests of India, Myanmar, Laos, Thailand, Vietnam, Malaysia, Cambodia and Indonesia (Sumatra, Java, Bali, Lombok, Timor).
