= Cylindrecamptus =

Scientific classification
- Kingdom: Animalia
- Phylum: Arthropoda
- Class: Insecta
- Order: Coleoptera
- Suborder: Polyphaga
- Infraorder: Cucujiformia
- Family: Cerambycidae
- Tribe: Dorcaschematini
- Genus: Cylindrecamptus; Breuning, 1940
- Species: C. lineatus

Binomial name
- Cylindrecamptus lineatus (Aurivillius, 1914)

Genus of beetles

Cylindrecamptus is a monotypic genus in the family Cerambycidae described by Stephan von Breuning in 1940. Its single species, Cylindrecamptus lineatus, was described by Per Olof Christopher Aurivillius in 1914.
