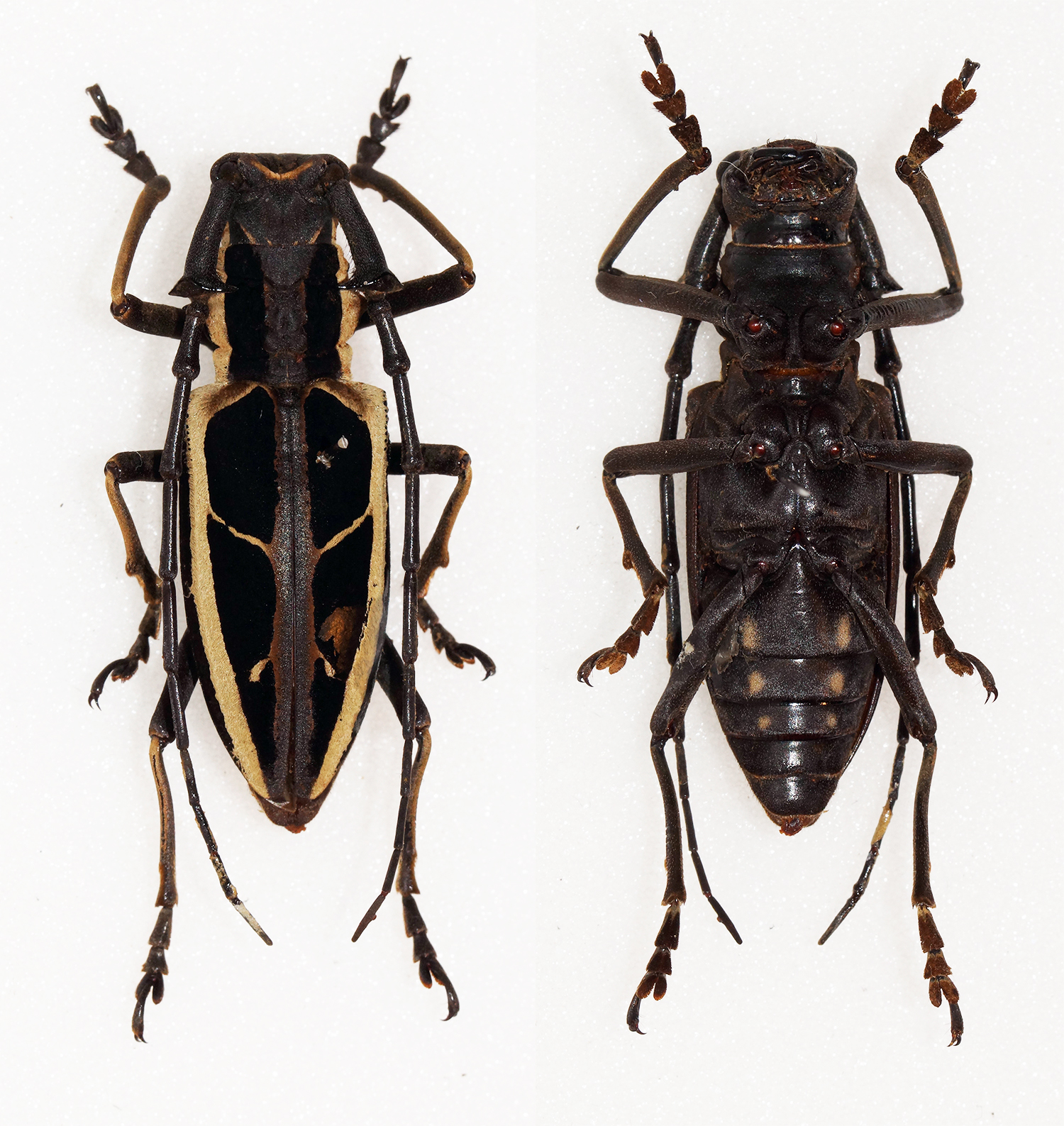

Scientific classification
- Kingdom: Animalia
- Phylum: Arthropoda
- Class: Insecta
- Order: Coleoptera
- Suborder: Polyphaga
- Infraorder: Cucujiformia
- Family: Cerambycidae
- Genus: Stratioceros
- Species: S. princeps

Binomial name
- Stratioceros princeps Lacordaire, 1869

= Stratioceros =

Genus of beetles

Stratioceros princeps is a species of beetle in the family Cerambycidae, and the only species in the genus Stratioceros. It was described by Lacordaire in 1869.
