= Taeniodera =

- Taeniodera zebraea Fairmaire

Scientific classification
- Kingdom: Animalia
- Phylum: Arthropoda
- Clade: Pancrustacea
- Class: Insecta
- Order: Coleoptera
- Suborder: Polyphaga
- Infraorder: Scarabaeiformia
- Family: Scarabaeidae
- Subfamily: Cetoniinae
- Tribe: Taenioderini
- Genus: Taeniodera; Burmeister, 1842

Synonyms
- Ataenia Schoch, 1894; Melinospila Kraatz, 1890; Carolina Thomson, 1880; Polydomia Thomson, 1880

Genus of leaf beetles

Taeniodera is a genus of beetles belonging to the family Scarabaeidae.

== Species ==
- Taeniodera abdominalis (Mohnike, 1873)
- Taeniodera anceps (Waterhouse, 1881)
- Taeniodera angustata (Arrow, 1946)
- Taeniodera anthracina (Gory & Percheron, 1833)
- Taeniodera aurantiaca (Snellen Van Vollenhoven, 1858)
- Taeniodera bandahara Krikken, 1982
- Taeniodera baolocensis Jákl, 2012
- Taeniodera batillifera (Bourgoin, 1914)
- Taeniodera beaudouini Pavićević, 1984
- Taeniodera bisignata (Moser, 1913)
- Taeniodera boettcheri (Moser, 1915)
- Taeniodera borneensis Kraatz, 1892
- Taeniodera bourgoini (Ruter, 1972)
- Taeniodera brahmana Jákl, 2008
- Taeniodera bufo (Arrow, 1910)
- Taeniodera bujanga Jákl, 2008
- Taeniodera celebensis Krikken, 1982
- Taeniodera cervina (Wallace, 1867)
- Taeniodera chewi Legrand, 2000
- Taeniodera coomani (Bourgoin, 1926)
- Taeniodera coorgica (Arrow, 1941)
- Taeniodera cordata (Schoch, 1897)
- Taeniodera corticalis (Wallace, 1867)
- Taeniodera crucicollis Lansberge, 1887
- Taeniodera cupreicollis (Bourgoin, 1924)
- Taeniodera cuprithorax Mikšić, 1976
- Taeniodera dessumi (Ruter, 1972)
- Taeniodera ditissima Bates, 1889
- Taeniodera ebenina Jákl, 2008
- Taeniodera egregia (Gory & Percheron, 1833)
- Taeniodera fenestrata (Arrow, 1946)
- Taeniodera flavofasciata (Moser, 1901)
- Taeniodera flavomaculata (Gory & Percheron, 1833)
- Taeniodera flavosparsa (Waterhouse, 1888)
- Taeniodera fujiokai Jákl, 2014
- Taeniodera garnieri (Bourgoin, 1917)
- Taeniodera gratiosa (Mohnike, 1873)
- Taeniodera gregori Reichenbach, 1996
- Taeniodera haematica (Perty, 1831)
- Taeniodera halyi (Sharp, 1886)
- Taeniodera huaphana Krajčik, 2010
- Taeniodera idolica Janson, 1909
- Taeniodera indica Janson, 1909
- Taeniodera inermis Krikken, 1982
- Taeniodera inexpectata Jákl, 2020
- Taeniodera jakli Legrand, 2017
- Taeniodera jirouxi Legrand, 2000
- Taeniodera jucunda (Mohnike, 1873)
- Taeniodera kinabaluana (Arrow, 1932)
- Taeniodera krikkeni Legrand & Chew Kea Foo, 2010
- Taeniodera kubani Jákl, 2012
- Taeniodera laosensis Jákl, 2012
- Taeniodera laotica (Bourgoin, 1923)
- Taeniodera longipenis Jákl, 2011
- Taeniodera luteovaria (Bourgoin, 1917)
- Taeniodera malabariensis (Gory & Percheron, 1833)
- Taeniodera marmorata (Wallace, 1867)
- Taeniodera miksiciana Krajčik, 2010
- Taeniodera minanga Jákl & Krajčik, 2004
- Taeniodera modesta Schoch, 1897
- Taeniodera monacha (Gory & Percheron, 1833)
- Taeniodera murzini Jákl, 2012
- Taeniodera niasana (Schoch, 1897)
- Taeniodera nigra Jákl, 2011
- Taeniodera nigricollis (Janson, 1881)
- Taeniodera nigrithorax Mikšić, 1972
- Taeniodera nigroochracea Jákl, 2008
- Taeniodera novakorum Jákl, 2022
- Taeniodera oberthuri Lansberge, 1887
- Taeniodera ochraceipes (Waterhouse, 1888)
- Taeniodera oudemansi (Valck Lucassen, 1932)
- Taeniodera pentapunctata Jákl, 2008
- Taeniodera picta (Guérin-Méneville, 1840)
- Taeniodera quadrivittata (Schaum, 1848)
- Taeniodera rafflesiana (Westwood, 1842)
- Taeniodera rakovici Jákl, 2025
- Taeniodera rubia Legrand & Jákl, 2017
- Taeniodera rutilans Ma, 1988
- Taeniodera sakaii Antoine, 2000
- Taeniodera salvazai (Bourgoin, 1924)
- Taeniodera sannio (Janson, 1883)
- Taeniodera sericea (Gestro, 1888)
- Taeniodera siamensis Antoine, 1998
- Taeniodera sikerei Jákl & Krajčik, 2006
- Taeniodera steinkei Reichenbach, 1996
- Taeniodera takashii Jákl, 2012
- Taeniodera tricolor (Mohnike, 1873)
- Taeniodera trusmadiana Legrand, 2004
- Taeniodera viridula (Niijima & Matsumura, 1923)
- Taeniodera waterhousei (Arrow, 1910)
- Taeniodera zebraea Fairmaire, 1893
