= Pemptolasius =

Scientific classification
- Domain: Eukaryota
- Kingdom: Animalia
- Phylum: Arthropoda
- Class: Insecta
- Order: Coleoptera
- Suborder: Polyphaga
- Infraorder: Cucujiformia
- Family: Cerambycidae
- Genus: Pemptolasius
- Species: P. humeralis

Binomial name
- Pemptolasius humeralis Gahan, 1890

Genus of beetles

Pemptolasius humeralis is a species of beetle in the family Cerambycidae, and the only species in the genus Pemptolasius. It was described by Gahan in 1890.
