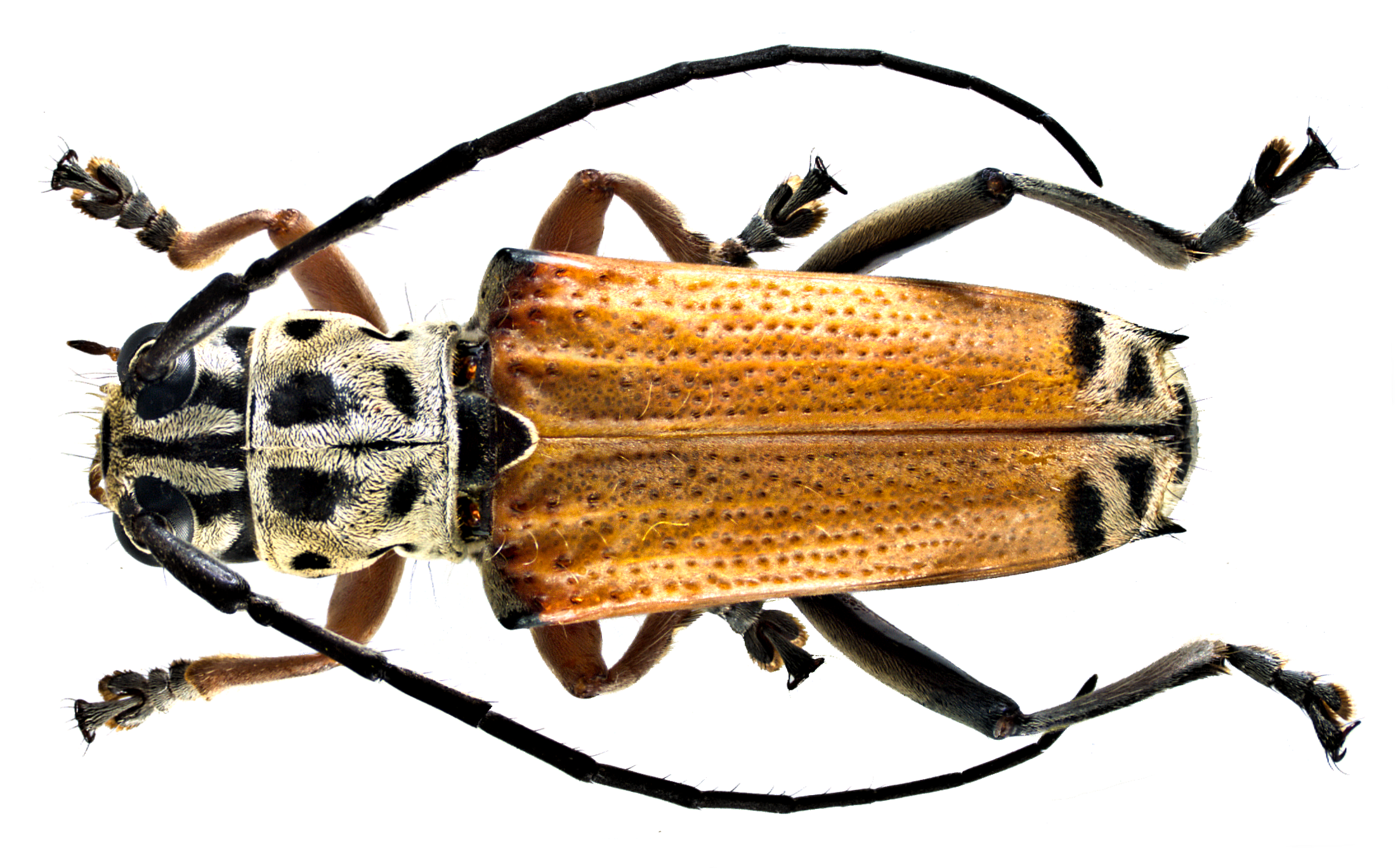

Scientific classification
- Kingdom: Animalia
- Phylum: Arthropoda
- Clade: Pancrustacea
- Class: Insecta
- Order: Coleoptera
- Suborder: Polyphaga
- Infraorder: Cucujiformia
- Family: Cerambycidae
- Genus: Glenea
- Species: G. cantor

Binomial name
- Glenea cantor (Fabricius, 1787)

Synonyms
- Lamia cantor Fabricius, 1787

= Glenea cantor =

Species of beetle

Glenea cantor is a species of beetle in the family Cerambycidae. It was described by Johan Christian Fabricius in 1787. It is known from the Philippines, Cambodia, Laos, Hong Kong, India, Bangladesh, Thailand, China, and Vietnam.

== Subspecies ==
- Glenea cantor cantor (Fabricius, 1787)
- Glenea cantor luzonica Aurivillius, 1926
- Glenea cantor obesa (Thomson, 1857)
