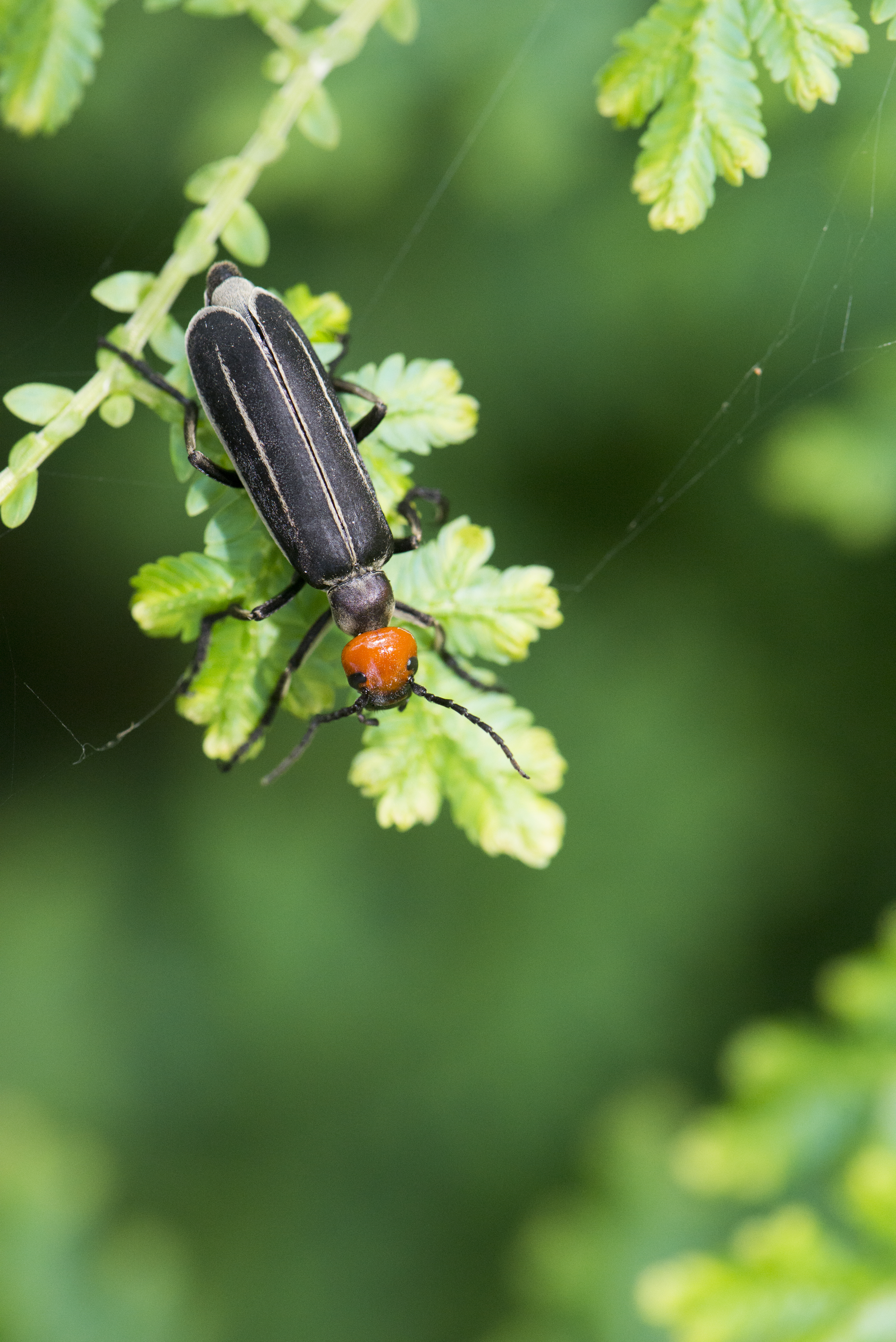
- Specimen from Jiji Town, Nantou County

Scientific classification
- Kingdom: Animalia
- Phylum: Arthropoda
- Clade: Pancrustacea
- Class: Insecta
- Order: Coleoptera
- Suborder: Polyphaga
- Infraorder: Cucujiformia
- Family: Meloidae
- Subfamily: Meloinae
- Tribe: Epicautini
- Genus: Epicauta
- Species: E. waterhousei

Binomial name
- Epicauta waterhousei Haag-Rutenberg, 1880

= Epicauta waterhousei =

Species of beetle

Epicauta waterhousei is an Asian species of oil beetle (Coleoptera: Meloidae) recorded from Thailand (Central and Northeast provinces), Cambodia, and Taiwan.

== Description and pest status ==
The adults of E. waterhousei, which emerge between April and July, are recognisable by their dull black elytra with a greyish longitudinal stripe, extending from humeral angle towards apex of elytron, and orange-red head does not have black dorsal markings. Similar species include E. erythrocephala, the type and E. gorhami from Honshu, Japan.

This species has been recorded eating: groundnuts, soybeans, eggplants, tomatoes, and slender amaranth (Amaranthus viridis).

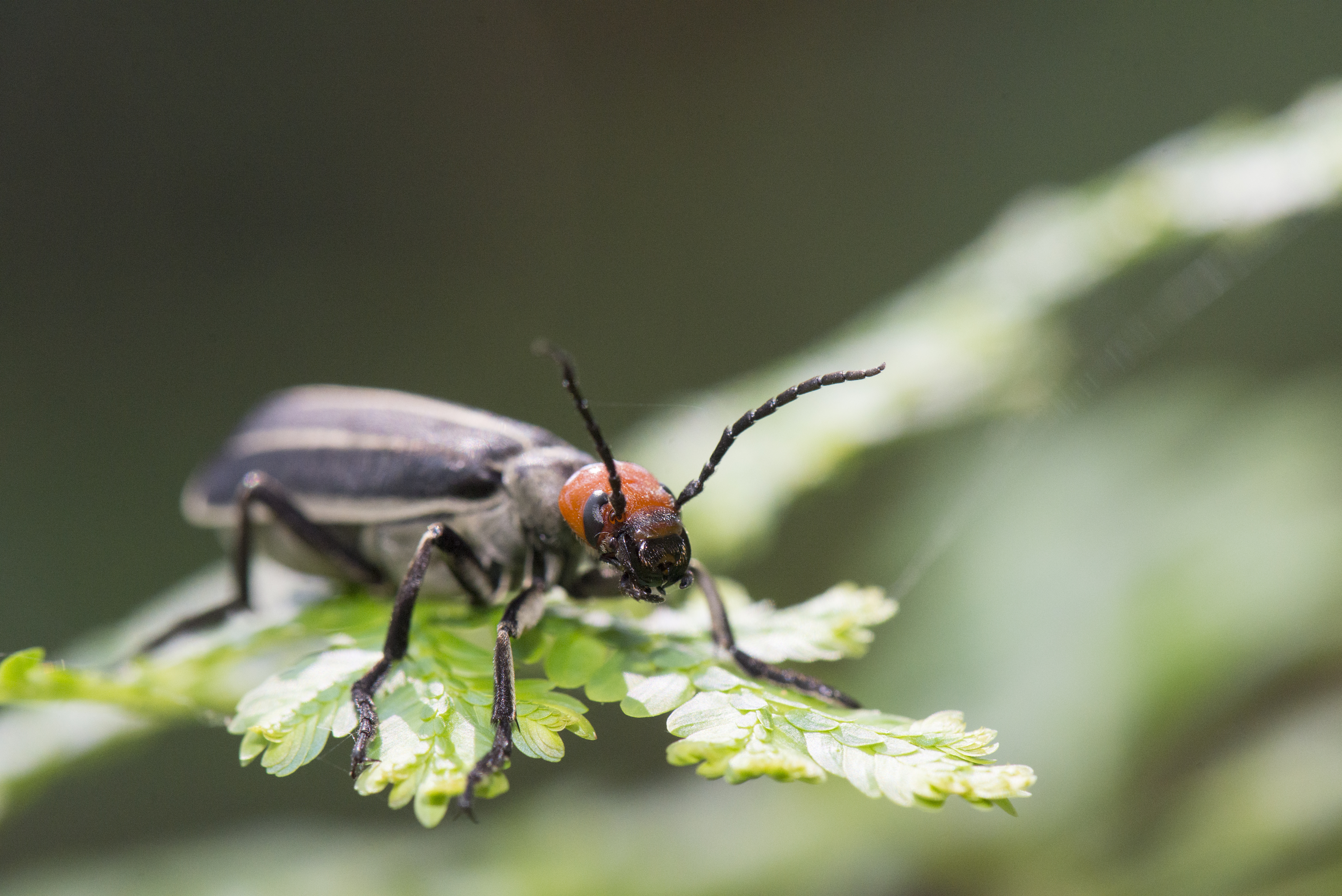

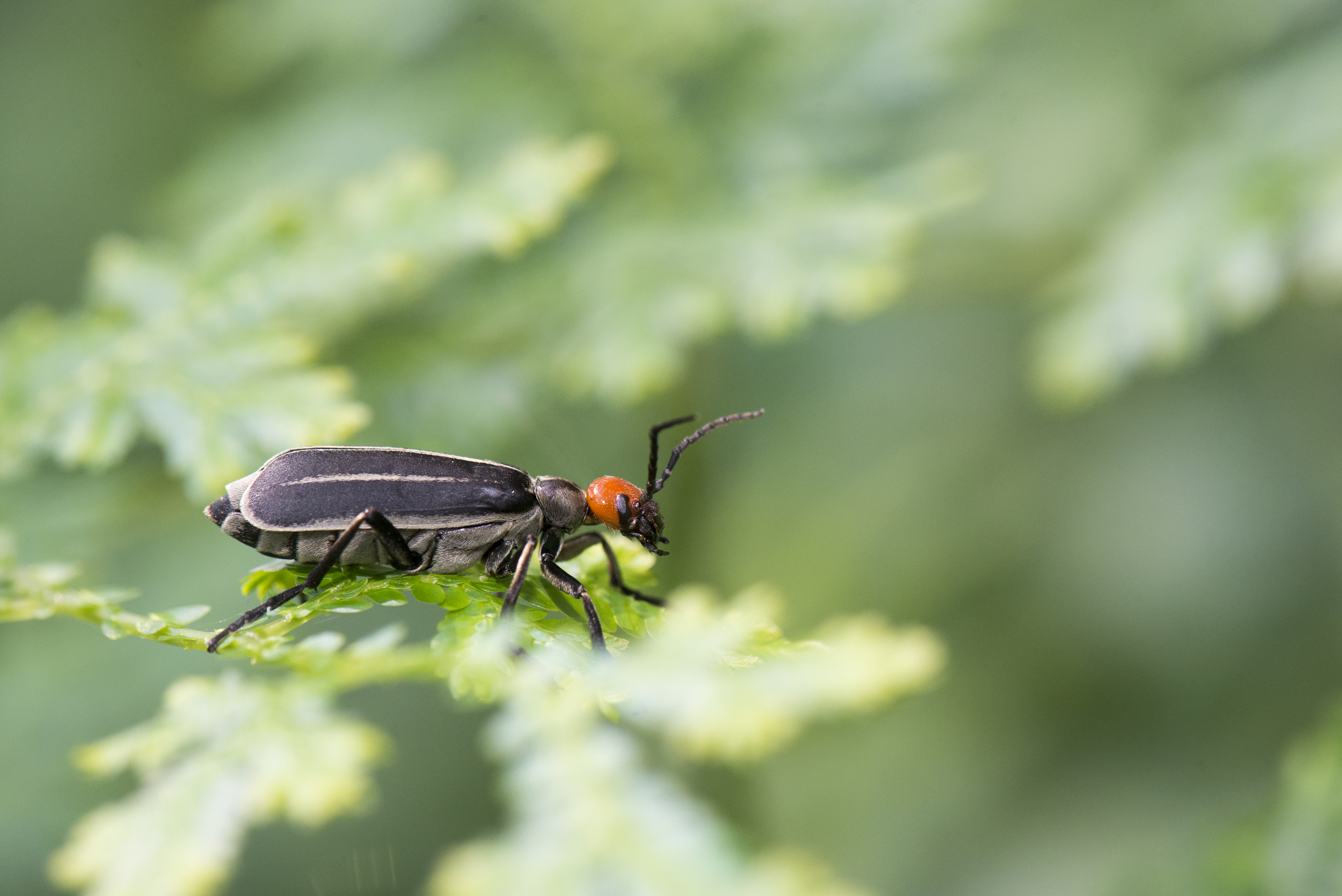

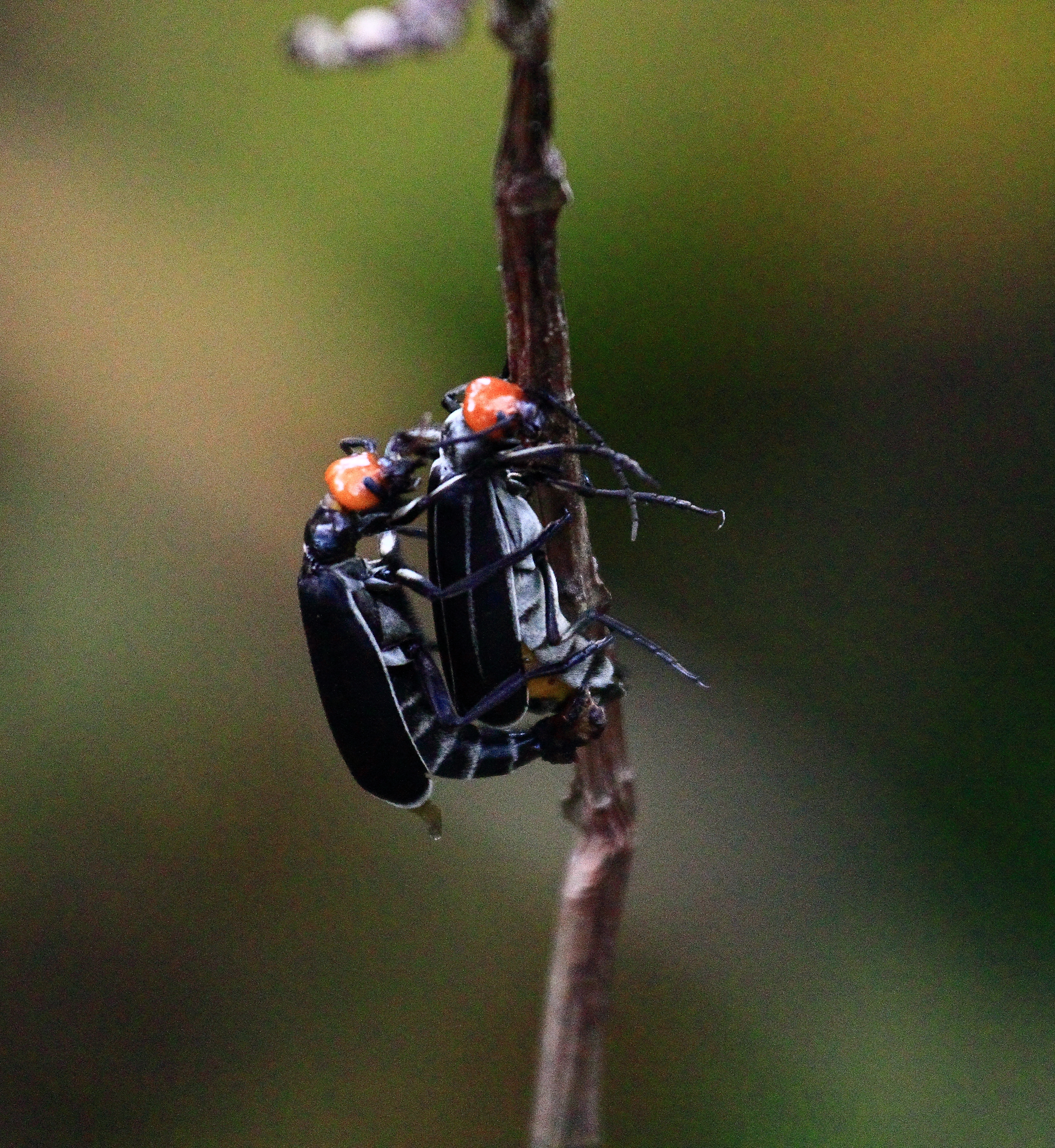
