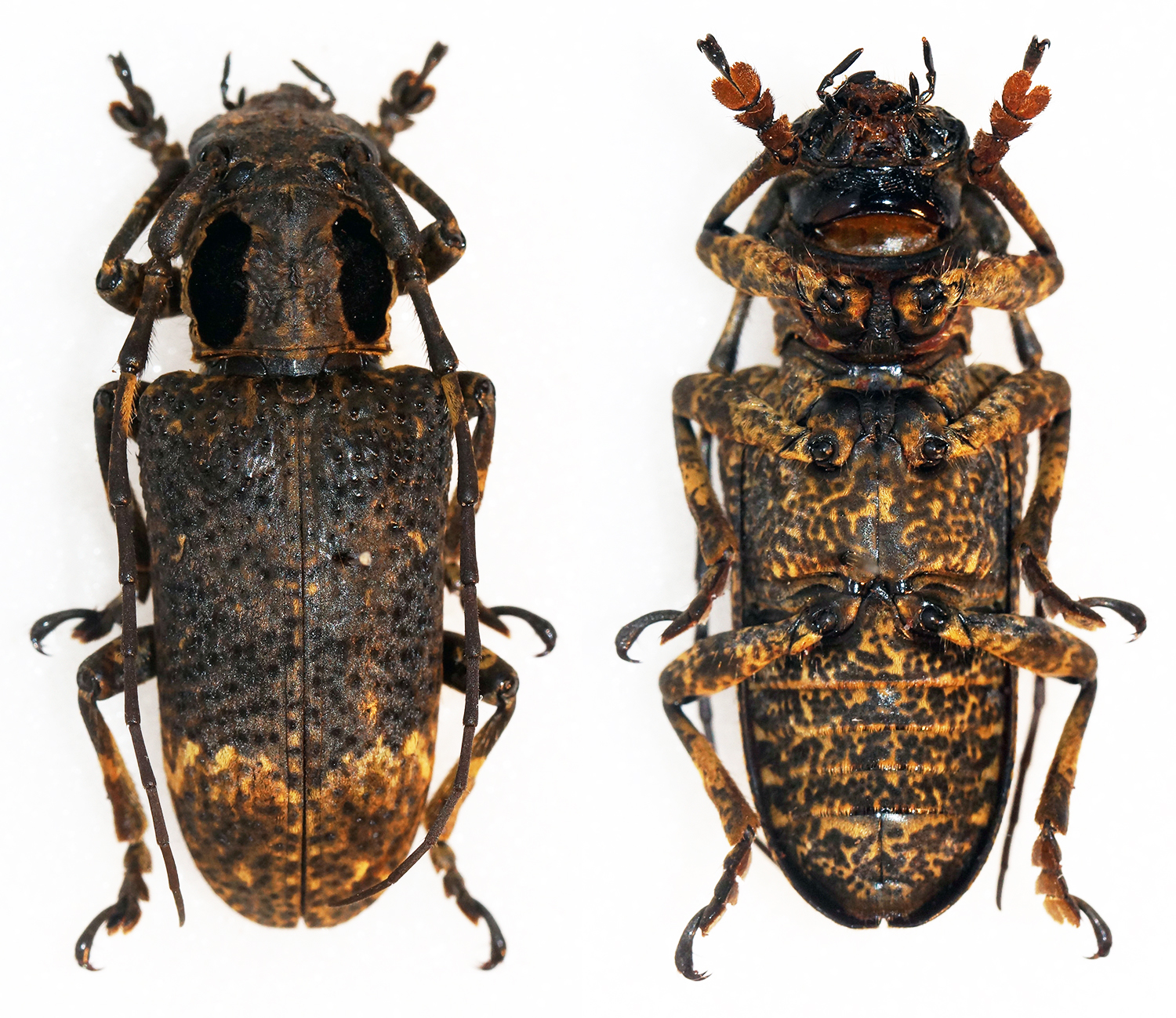

Scientific classification
- Domain: Eukaryota
- Kingdom: Animalia
- Phylum: Arthropoda
- Class: Insecta
- Order: Coleoptera
- Suborder: Polyphaga
- Infraorder: Cucujiformia
- Family: Cerambycidae
- Tribe: Pteropliini
- Genus: Alidus
- Species: A. biplagiatus

Binomial name
- Alidus biplagiatus Gahan, 1893

= Alidus =

Genus of beetles

Alidus is a genus of beetle in the family Cerambycidae. It is the only species in the genus Alidus biplagiatus. It was described by Gahan in 1893.
