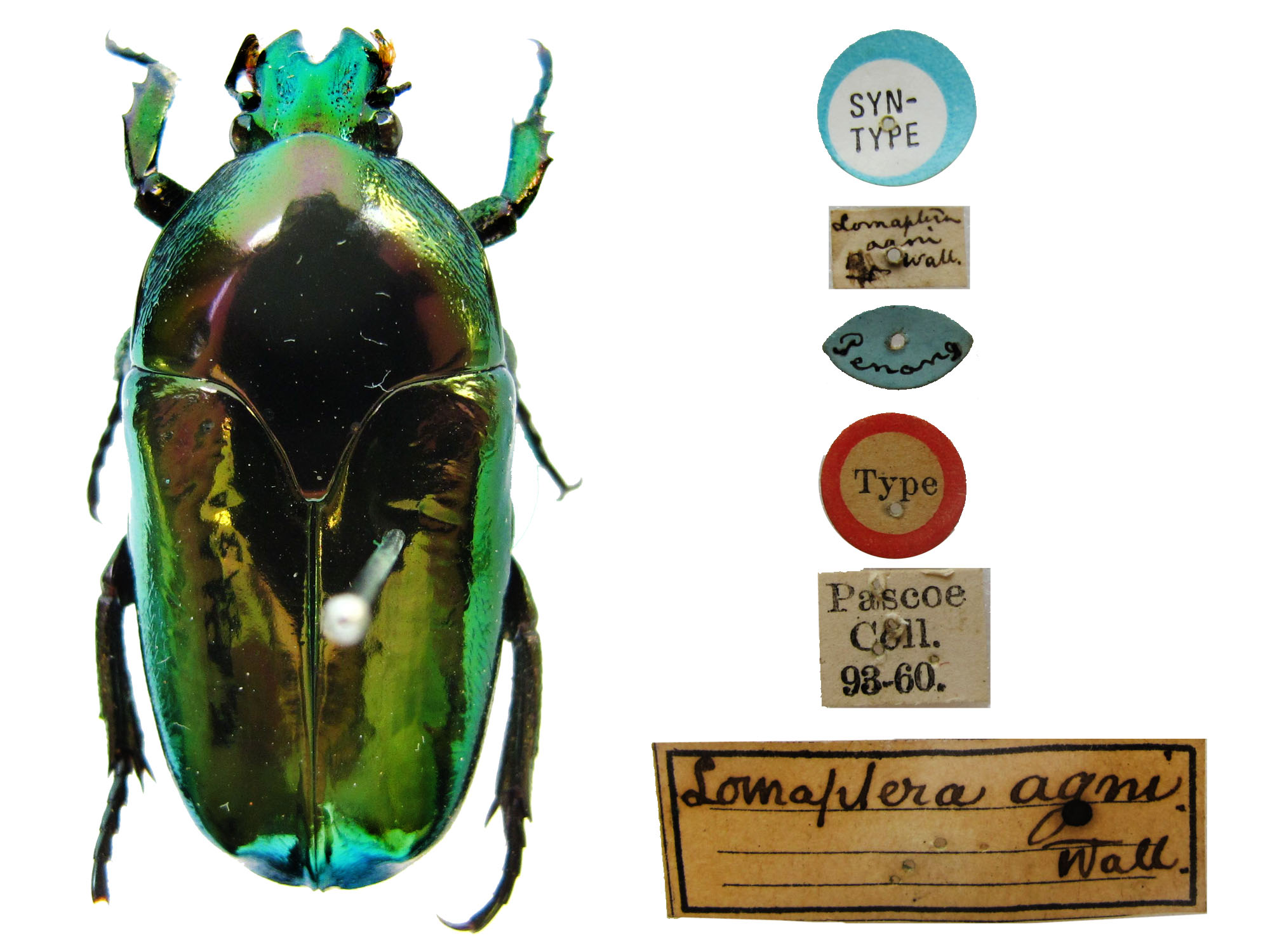

Scientific classification
- Domain: Eukaryota
- Kingdom: Animalia
- Phylum: Arthropoda
- Class: Insecta
- Order: Coleoptera
- Suborder: Polyphaga
- Infraorder: Scarabaeiformia
- Family: Scarabaeidae
- Genus: Thaumastopeus
- Species: T. agni

Binomial name
- Thaumastopeus agni Wallace, 1867

= Thaumastopeus agni =

Species of beetle

Thaumastopeus agni is a species of beetle described by Wallace in 1867. No subspecies are listed.
