= Dorcaschematini =

- Olenecamptus optatus

Scientific classification
- Kingdom: Animalia
- Phylum: Arthropoda
- Clade: Pancrustacea
- Class: Insecta
- Order: Coleoptera
- Suborder: Polyphaga
- Infraorder: Cucujiformia
- Family: Cerambycidae
- Subfamily: Lamiinae
- Tribe: Dorcaschematini; Thomson, 1860

Tribe of beetles

Dorcaschematini is a tribe of longhorn beetles of the subfamily Lamiinae.

== Genera ==
Biolib lists:

1. Brachyolenecamptus Breuning, 1948
2. Cylindrecamptus Breuning, 1940
3. Cylindrepomus Blanchard, 1853
4. Dorcaschema Haldeman, 1847
5. Falsocularia Breuning, 1942
6. Macrocamptus Dillon & Dillon, 1948
7. Microlenecamptus Pic, 1924
8. Momisofalsus Pic, 1950
9. Olenecamptus Chevrolat, 1835
