= Macrocamptus virgatus =

Scientific classification
- Domain: Eukaryota
- Kingdom: Animalia
- Phylum: Arthropoda
- Class: Insecta
- Order: Coleoptera
- Suborder: Polyphaga
- Infraorder: Cucujiformia
- Family: Cerambycidae
- Genus: Macrocamptus
- Species: M. virgatus

Binomial name
- Macrocamptus virgatus (Gahan, 1890)

Synonyms
- Cylindrepomus virgatus Gahan, 1890

Species of beetle

Macrocamptus virgatus is a species of beetle in the family Cerambycidae. It was described by Gahan in 1890, originally under the genus Cylindrepomus. It is known from Laos.
