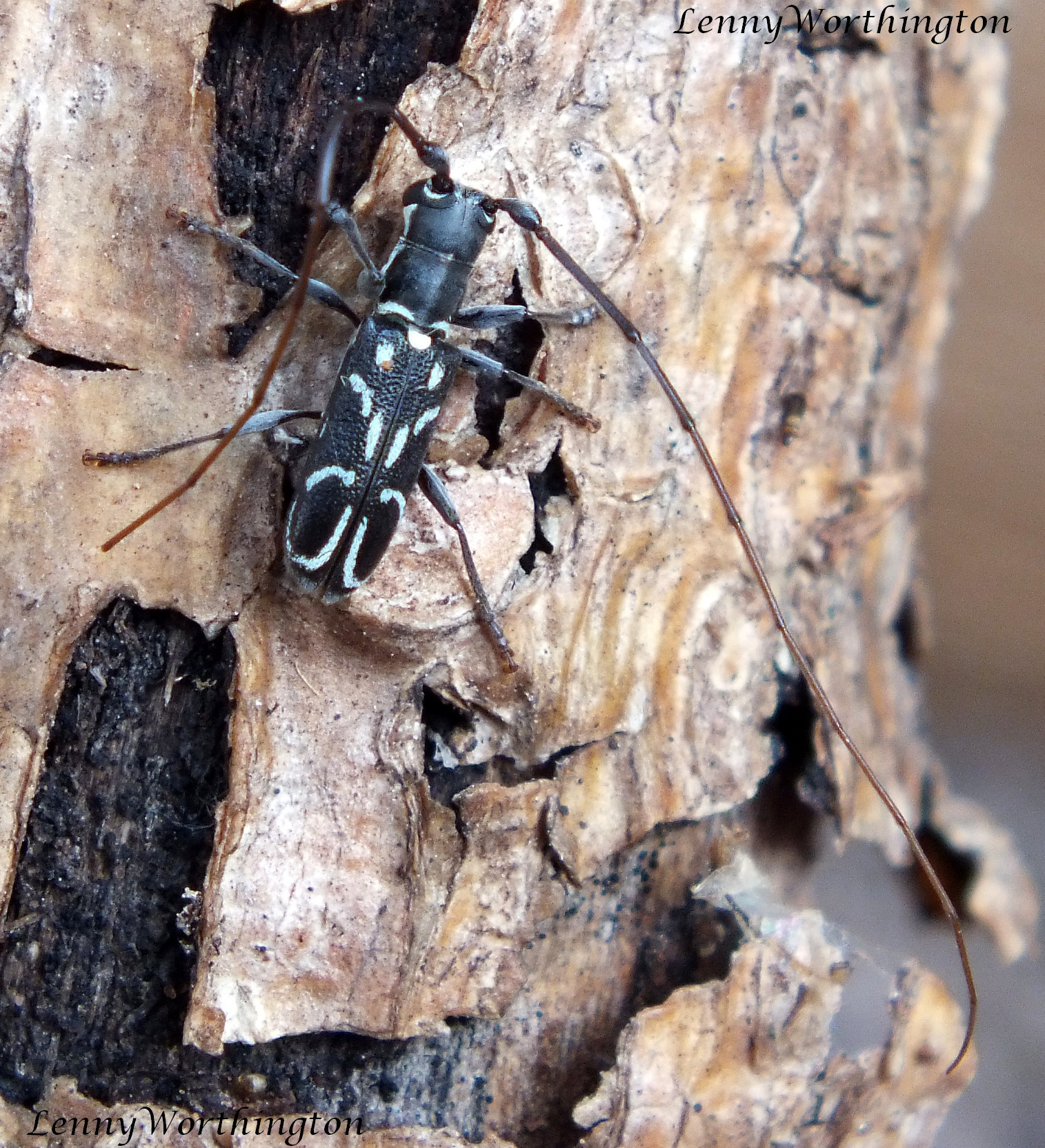

Scientific classification
- Domain: Eukaryota
- Kingdom: Animalia
- Phylum: Arthropoda
- Class: Insecta
- Order: Coleoptera
- Suborder: Polyphaga
- Infraorder: Cucujiformia
- Family: Cerambycidae
- Genus: Microlenecamptus
- Species: M. signatus

Binomial name
- Microlenecamptus signatus (Aurivillius, 1914)

Synonyms
- Cylindrepomus signatus Aurivillius, 1914

= Microlenecamptus signatus =

Species of beetle

Microlenecamptus signatus is a species of beetle in the family Cerambycidae. It was described by Per Olof Christopher Aurivillius in 1914, originally under the genus Cylindrepomus. It is known from Laos and Myanmar.
