= Cylindrepomus cicindeloides =

Scientific classification
- Domain: Eukaryota
- Kingdom: Animalia
- Phylum: Arthropoda
- Class: Insecta
- Order: Coleoptera
- Suborder: Polyphaga
- Infraorder: Cucujiformia
- Family: Cerambycidae
- Genus: Cylindrepomus
- Species: C. cicindeloides

Binomial name
- Cylindrepomus cicindeloides Schwarzer, 1926

Species of beetle

Cylindrepomus cicindeloides is a species of beetle in the family Cerambycidae. It was described by Schwarzer in 1926.
