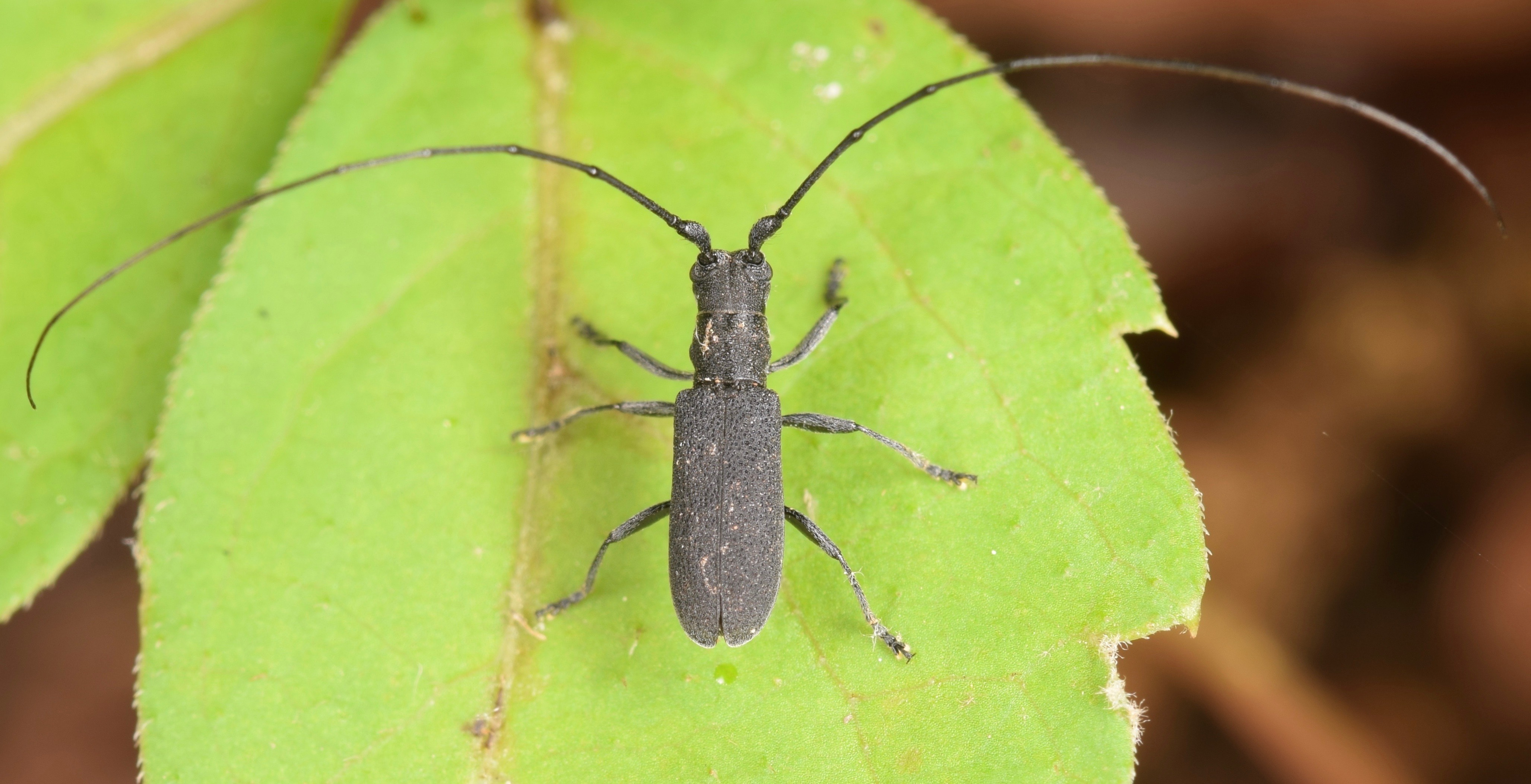

Scientific classification
- Kingdom: Animalia
- Phylum: Arthropoda
- Class: Insecta
- Order: Coleoptera
- Suborder: Polyphaga
- Infraorder: Cucujiformia
- Family: Cerambycidae
- Genus: Dorcaschema
- Species: D. nigrum

Binomial name
- Dorcaschema nigrum (Say, 1826)

Synonyms
- Saperda nigra Say, 1826; Dorcaschema nigra (Say) Haldeman, 1847 (misspelling)

= Dorcaschema nigrum =

Species of beetle

Dorcaschema nigrum is a species of beetle in the family Cerambycidae. It was described by Say in 1826, originally under the genus Saperda. It is known from Canada and the United States.
