= Cylindrepomus nigrofasciatus =

Scientific classification
- Domain: Eukaryota
- Kingdom: Animalia
- Phylum: Arthropoda
- Class: Insecta
- Order: Coleoptera
- Suborder: Polyphaga
- Infraorder: Cucujiformia
- Family: Cerambycidae
- Genus: Cylindrepomus
- Species: C. nigrofasciatus

Binomial name
- Cylindrepomus nigrofasciatus Blanchard, 1853

Species of beetle

Cylindrepomus nigrofasciatus is a species of beetle in the family Cerambycidae. It was described by Émile Blanchard in 1853. It contains the varietas Cylindrepomus nigrofasciatus var. fulvithorax.
