= Cylindrepomus hayashi =

Scientific classification
- Domain: Eukaryota
- Kingdom: Animalia
- Phylum: Arthropoda
- Class: Insecta
- Order: Coleoptera
- Suborder: Polyphaga
- Infraorder: Cucujiformia
- Family: Cerambycidae
- Genus: Cylindrepomus
- Species: C. hayashi

Binomial name
- Cylindrepomus hayashi Hüdepohl, 1987

Species of beetle

Cylindrepomus hayashi is a species of beetle in the family Cerambycidae. It was described by Hüdepohl in 1987.
