= Microlenecamptus biocellatus =

Scientific classification
- Domain: Eukaryota
- Kingdom: Animalia
- Phylum: Arthropoda
- Class: Insecta
- Order: Coleoptera
- Suborder: Polyphaga
- Infraorder: Cucujiformia
- Family: Cerambycidae
- Genus: Microlenecamptus
- Species: M. biocellatus

Binomial name
- Microlenecamptus biocellatus (Schwarzer, 1925)

Synonyms
- Dorcaschema biocellatum (Schwarzer) Matsushita, 1933; Olenecamptus biocellatus Schwarzer, 1925; Olenecamptus virescens Savio, 1929

Species of beetle

Microlenecamptus biocellatus is a species of beetle in the family Cerambycidae. It was described by Schwarzer in 1925, originally under the genus Olenecamptus.
