= Brachyolenecamptus =

Scientific classification
- Kingdom: Animalia
- Phylum: Arthropoda
- Class: Insecta
- Order: Coleoptera
- Suborder: Polyphaga
- Infraorder: Cucujiformia
- Family: Cerambycidae
- Tribe: Dorcaschematini
- Genus: Brachyolenecamptus

Species
- See text

Genus of beetles

Brachyolenecamptus is a genus of longhorn beetles of the subfamily Lamiinae.

== Species ==
The genus contains the following species:

- Brachyolenecamptus banksi Breuning, 1948
- Brachyolenecamptus fuscosticticus Breuning, 1948
