= Momisofalsus =

Scientific classification
- Kingdom: Animalia
- Phylum: Arthropoda
- Clade: Pancrustacea
- Class: Insecta
- Order: Coleoptera
- Suborder: Polyphaga
- Infraorder: Cucujiformia
- Family: Cerambycidae
- Subfamily: Lamiinae
- Tribe: Dorcaschematini
- Genus: Momisofalsus
- Species: M. clermonti

Binomial name
- Momisofalsus clermonti Pic, 1950

Genus of beetles

Momisofalsus clermonti is a species of beetle in the family Cerambycidae, and the only species in the genus Momisofalsus. And its class is insecta. It was described by Maurice Pic in 1950. It s found in Vietnam.
