= Cylindrepomus vittatus =

Scientific classification
- Kingdom: Animalia
- Phylum: Arthropoda
- Class: Insecta
- Order: Coleoptera
- Suborder: Polyphaga
- Infraorder: Cucujiformia
- Family: Cerambycidae
- Genus: Cylindrepomus
- Species: C. vittatus

Binomial name
- Cylindrepomus vittatus (Pic, 1925)

Synonyms
- Cylindrepomus rubriceps (Aurivillius) Dillon & Dillon, 1948; Hippardium vittatum Pic, 1925

Species of beetle

Cylindrepomus vittatus is a species of beetle in the family Cerambycidae. It was described by Maurice Pic in 1925, originally under the genus Hippardium.
