= Cylindrepomus biconjunctus =

Scientific classification
- Kingdom: Animalia
- Phylum: Arthropoda
- Class: Insecta
- Order: Coleoptera
- Suborder: Polyphaga
- Infraorder: Cucujiformia
- Family: Cerambycidae
- Genus: Cylindrepomus
- Species: C. biconjunctus

Binomial name
- Cylindrepomus biconjunctus Breuning, 1940

Synonyms
- Cylindrepomus biconjunctus Breuning & De Jong, 1941 nec Breuning, 1940

Species of beetle

Cylindrepomus biconjunctus is a species of beetle in the family Cerambycidae. It was described by Stephan von Breuning in 1940. It is known from Sumatra.
