= Cylindrepomus viridipennis =

Scientific classification
- Kingdom: Animalia
- Phylum: Arthropoda
- Class: Insecta
- Order: Coleoptera
- Suborder: Polyphaga
- Infraorder: Cucujiformia
- Family: Cerambycidae
- Genus: Cylindrepomus
- Species: C. viridipennis

Binomial name
- Cylindrepomus viridipennis (Pic, 1937)

Synonyms
- Olenecamptus viridipennis Pic, 1937

Species of beetle

Cylindrepomus viridipennis is a species of beetle in the family Cerambycidae. It was described by Maurice Pic in 1937. It is known from Thailand, Vietnam and Laos.
