= Microlenecamptus obsoletus =

Scientific classification
- Kingdom: Animalia
- Phylum: Arthropoda
- Class: Insecta
- Order: Coleoptera
- Suborder: Polyphaga
- Infraorder: Cucujiformia
- Family: Cerambycidae
- Genus: Microlenecamptus
- Species: M. obsoletus

Binomial name
- Microlenecamptus obsoletus (Fairmaire, 1888)

Synonyms
- Olenecamptus obsoletus Fairmaire, 1888

Species of beetle

Microlenecamptus obsoletus is a species of beetle in the family Cerambycidae. It was described by Fairmaire in 1888, originally under the genus Olenecamptus. It is known from Taiwan and China.

== Subspecies ==
- Microlenecamptus obsoletus albatus (Matsushita, 1933)
- Microlenecamptus obsoletus obsoletus (Fairmaire, 1888)
