= Cylindrepomus rubriceps =

Scientific classification
- Kingdom: Animalia
- Phylum: Arthropoda
- Clade: Pancrustacea
- Class: Insecta
- Order: Coleoptera
- Suborder: Polyphaga
- Infraorder: Cucujiformia
- Family: Cerambycidae
- Genus: Cylindrepomus
- Species: C. rubriceps

Binomial name
- Cylindrepomus rubriceps (Aurivillius, 1907)

Species of beetle

Cylindrepomus rubriceps is a species of beetle in the family Cerambycidae. It was described by Per Olof Christopher Aurivillius in 1907. It is known from Borneo, Java and Sumatra.
