= Dorcaschema succineum =

Scientific classification
- Kingdom: Animalia
- Phylum: Arthropoda
- Class: Insecta
- Order: Coleoptera
- Suborder: Polyphaga
- Infraorder: Cucujiformia
- Family: Cerambycidae
- Genus: Dorcaschema
- Species: D. succineum

Binomial name
- Dorcaschema succineum Zang, 1905

Species of beetle

Dorcaschema succineum is an extinct species of beetle in the family Cerambycidae. It was described by Zang in 1905. It existed during the Upper Eocene, and has been discovered within Baltic amber.
