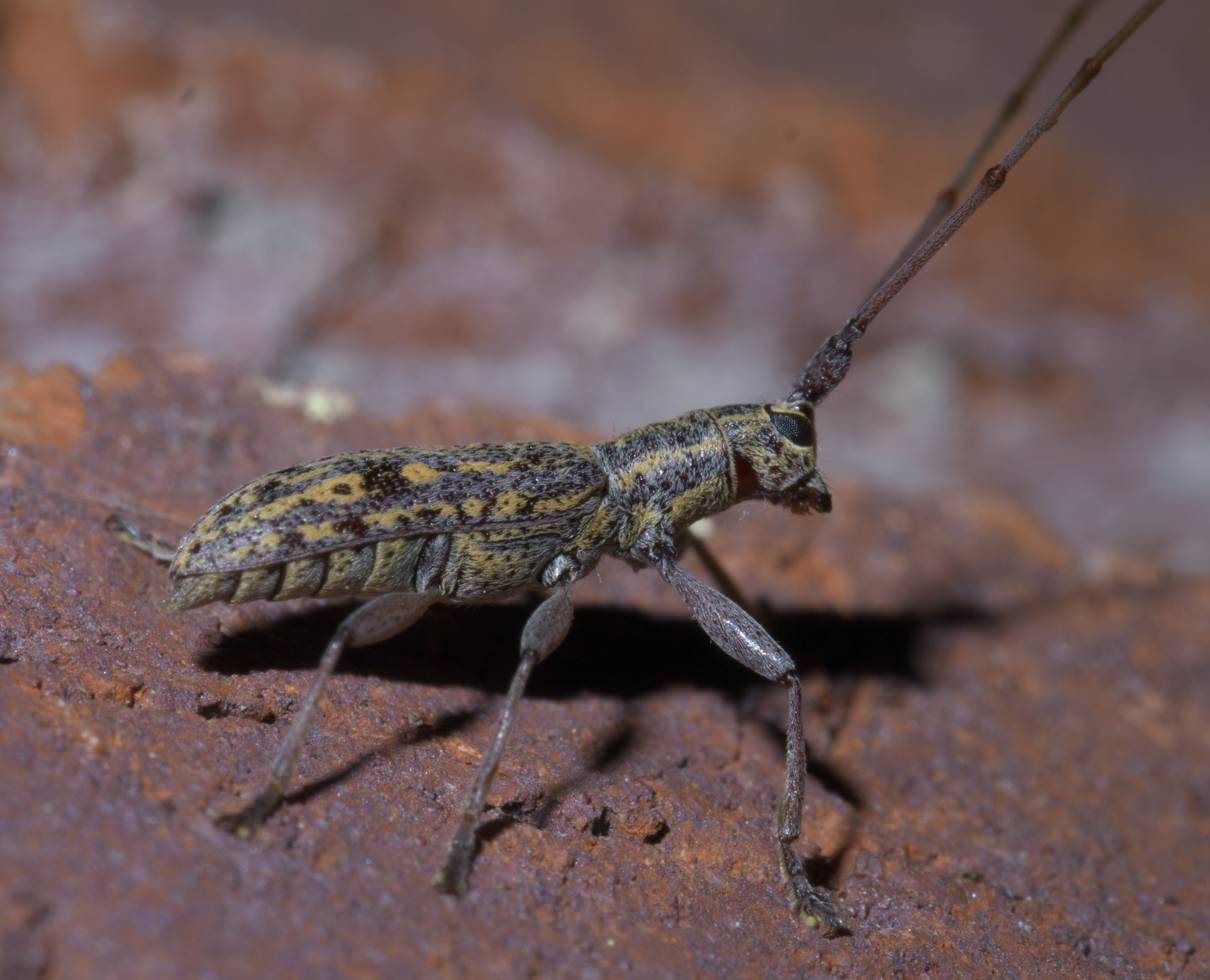

Scientific classification
- Kingdom: Animalia
- Phylum: Arthropoda
- Class: Insecta
- Order: Coleoptera
- Suborder: Polyphaga
- Infraorder: Cucujiformia
- Family: Cerambycidae
- Genus: Dorcaschema
- Species: D. alternatum

Binomial name
- Dorcaschema alternatum (Say, 1824)

Synonyms
- Dorcaschema octovittata Knull, 1937; Saperda alternata Say, 1824; Dorcaschema alternata (Say) Haldeman, 1847 (misspelling); Dorchaschema alternatum (Say) Leng & Hamilton, 1896 (misspelling)

= Dorcaschema alternatum =

Species of beetle

Dorcaschema alternatum is a species of beetle in the family Cerambycidae. It was described by Thomas Say in 1824, originally under the genus Saperda. It is known from the United States. It feeds on Morus celtidifolia.
