= Cylindrepomus grammicus =

Scientific classification
- Kingdom: Animalia
- Phylum: Arthropoda
- Clade: Pancrustacea
- Class: Insecta
- Order: Coleoptera
- Suborder: Polyphaga
- Infraorder: Cucujiformia
- Family: Cerambycidae
- Genus: Cylindrepomus
- Species: C. grammicus

Binomial name
- Cylindrepomus grammicus Pascoe, 1860

Species of beetle

Cylindrepomus grammicus is a species of beetle in the family Cerambycidae. It was described by Francis Polkinghorne Pascoe in 1860. It is known from Fiji, Moluccas, Indonesia, the Solomon Islands, Australia, Papua New Guinea, and Sulawesi.

== Varietas ==
- Cylindrepomus grammicus var. acuminatus Schwarzer, 1926
- Cylindrepomus grammicus var. latefasciatus Breuning, 1940
- Cylindrepomus grammicus var. oxypterus Fairmaire, 1879
- Cylindrepomus grammicus var. waigeuensis Gilmour, 1950
