= Brachyolenecamptus fuscosticticus =

Scientific classification
- Kingdom: Animalia
- Phylum: Arthropoda
- Class: Insecta
- Order: Coleoptera
- Suborder: Polyphaga
- Infraorder: Cucujiformia
- Family: Cerambycidae
- Genus: Brachyolenecamptus
- Species: B. fuscosticticus

Binomial name
- Brachyolenecamptus fuscosticticus Breuning, 1948

Species of beetle

Brachyolenecamptus fuscosticticus is a species of beetle in the family Cerambycidae. It was described by Stephan von Breuning in 1948. It is known from Borneo.
