= Cylindrepomus ballerioi =

Scientific classification
- Domain: Eukaryota
- Kingdom: Animalia
- Phylum: Arthropoda
- Class: Insecta
- Order: Coleoptera
- Suborder: Polyphaga
- Infraorder: Cucujiformia
- Family: Cerambycidae
- Genus: Cylindrepomus
- Species: C. ballerioi

Binomial name
- Cylindrepomus ballerioi Vitali, 2000

Species of beetle

Cylindrepomus ballerioi is a species of beetle in the family Cerambycidae. It was described by Vitali in 2000. It is known from Malaysia.
