= Macrocamptus andamanicus =

Scientific classification
- Domain: Eukaryota
- Kingdom: Animalia
- Phylum: Arthropoda
- Class: Insecta
- Order: Coleoptera
- Suborder: Polyphaga
- Infraorder: Cucujiformia
- Family: Cerambycidae
- Genus: Macrocamptus
- Species: M. andamanicus

Binomial name
- Macrocamptus andamanicus (Gardner, 1930)

Synonyms
- Cylindrepomus andamanicus Gardner, 1930

Species of beetle

Macrocamptus andamanicus is a species of beetle in the family Cerambycidae. It was described by Gardner in 1930.
