= Cylindrepomus mantiformis =

Scientific classification
- Kingdom: Animalia
- Phylum: Arthropoda
- Class: Insecta
- Order: Coleoptera
- Suborder: Polyphaga
- Infraorder: Cucujiformia
- Family: Cerambycidae
- Genus: Cylindrepomus
- Species: C. mantiformis

Binomial name
- Cylindrepomus mantiformis Hüdepohl, 1989

Species of beetle

Cylindrepomus mantiformis is a species of beetle in the family Cerambycidae. It was described by Hüdepohl in 1989. It is known from Borneo.
