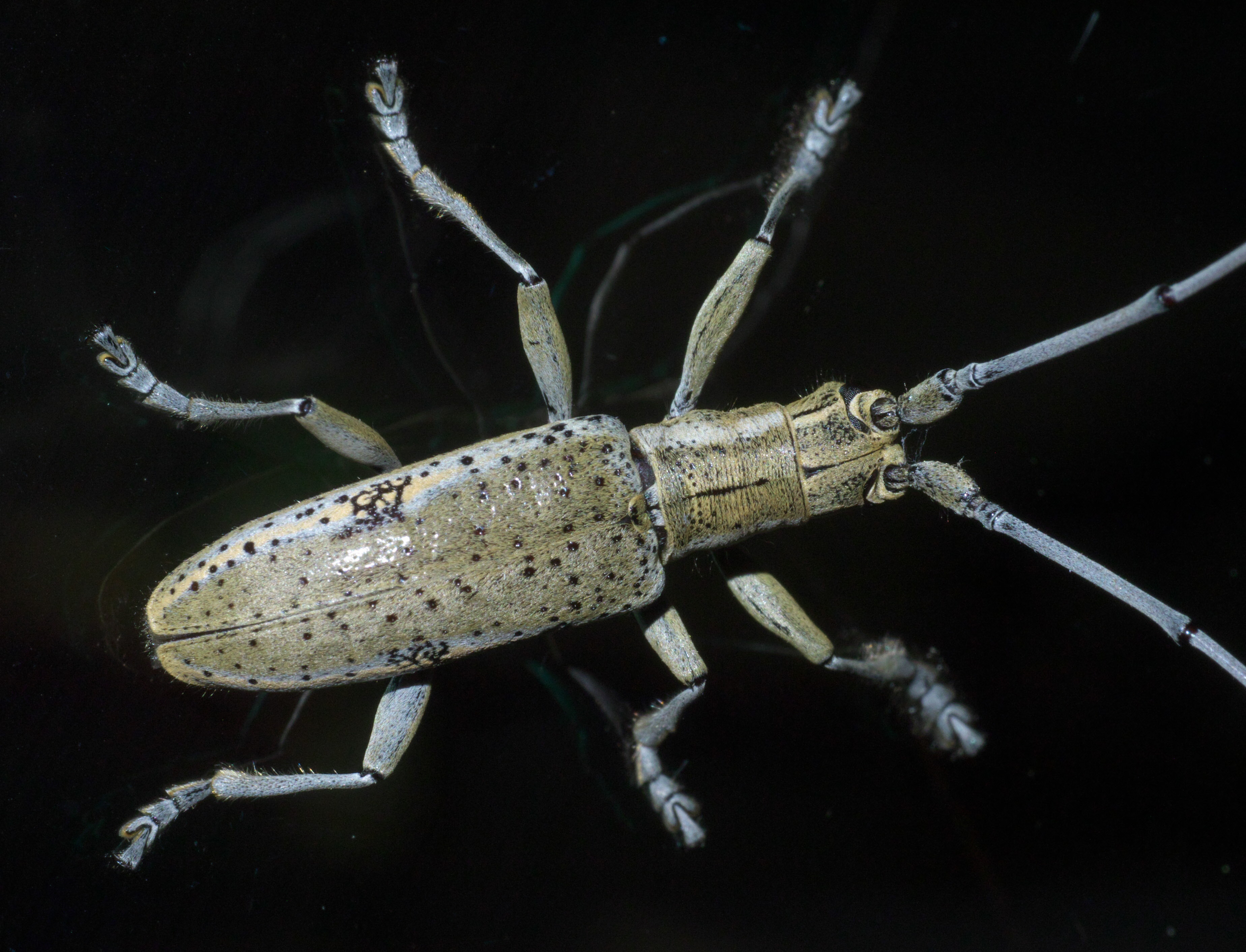

Scientific classification
- Kingdom: Animalia
- Phylum: Arthropoda
- Class: Insecta
- Order: Coleoptera
- Suborder: Polyphaga
- Infraorder: Cucujiformia
- Family: Cerambycidae
- Genus: Dorcaschema
- Species: D. wildii

Binomial name
- Dorcaschema wildii Uhler, 1855

Synonyms
- Dorchaschema wildii (Uhler) Leng & Hamilton, 1896 (misspelling)

= Dorcaschema wildii =

Species of beetle

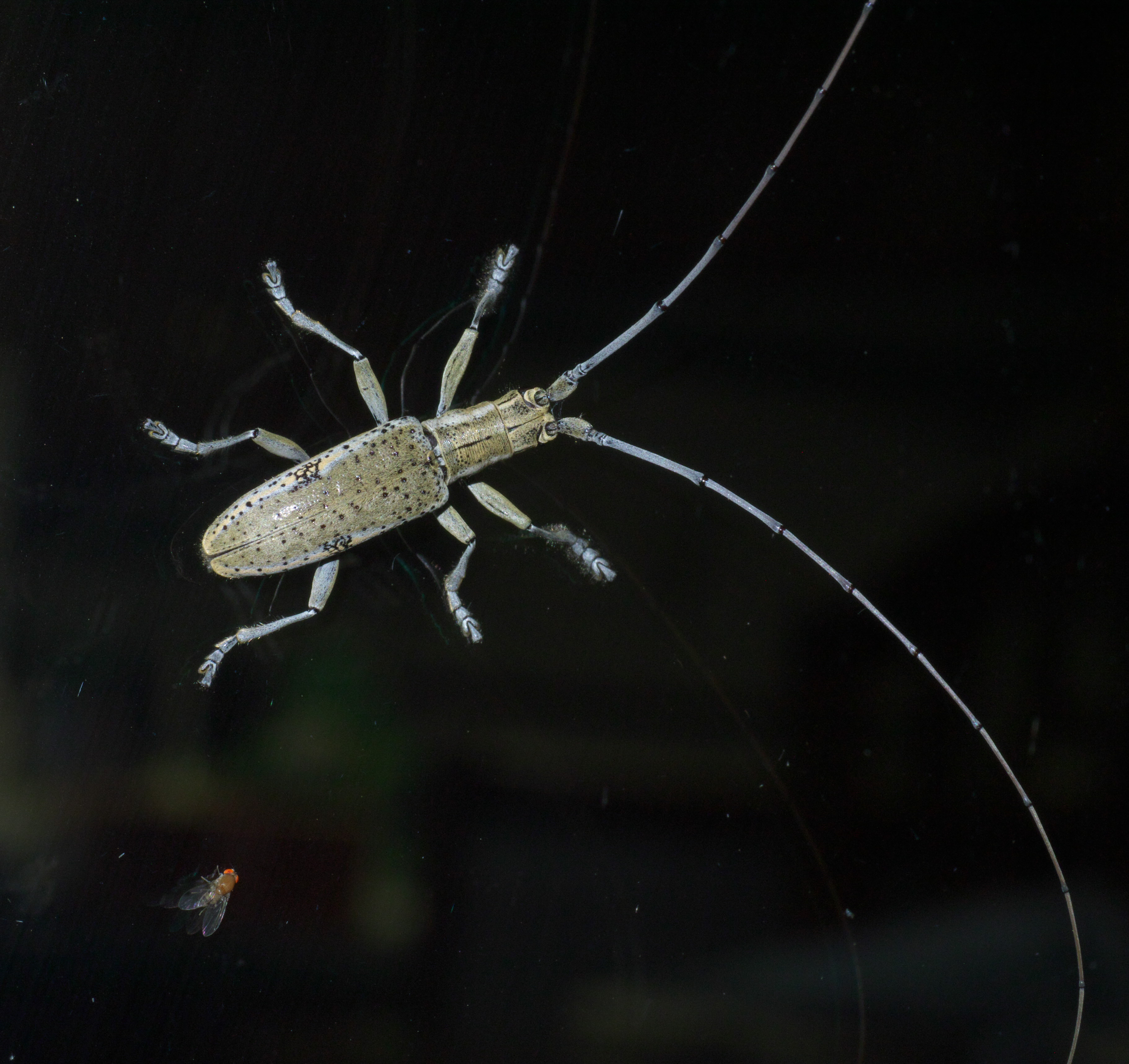
Dorcaschema wildii, mulberry borer

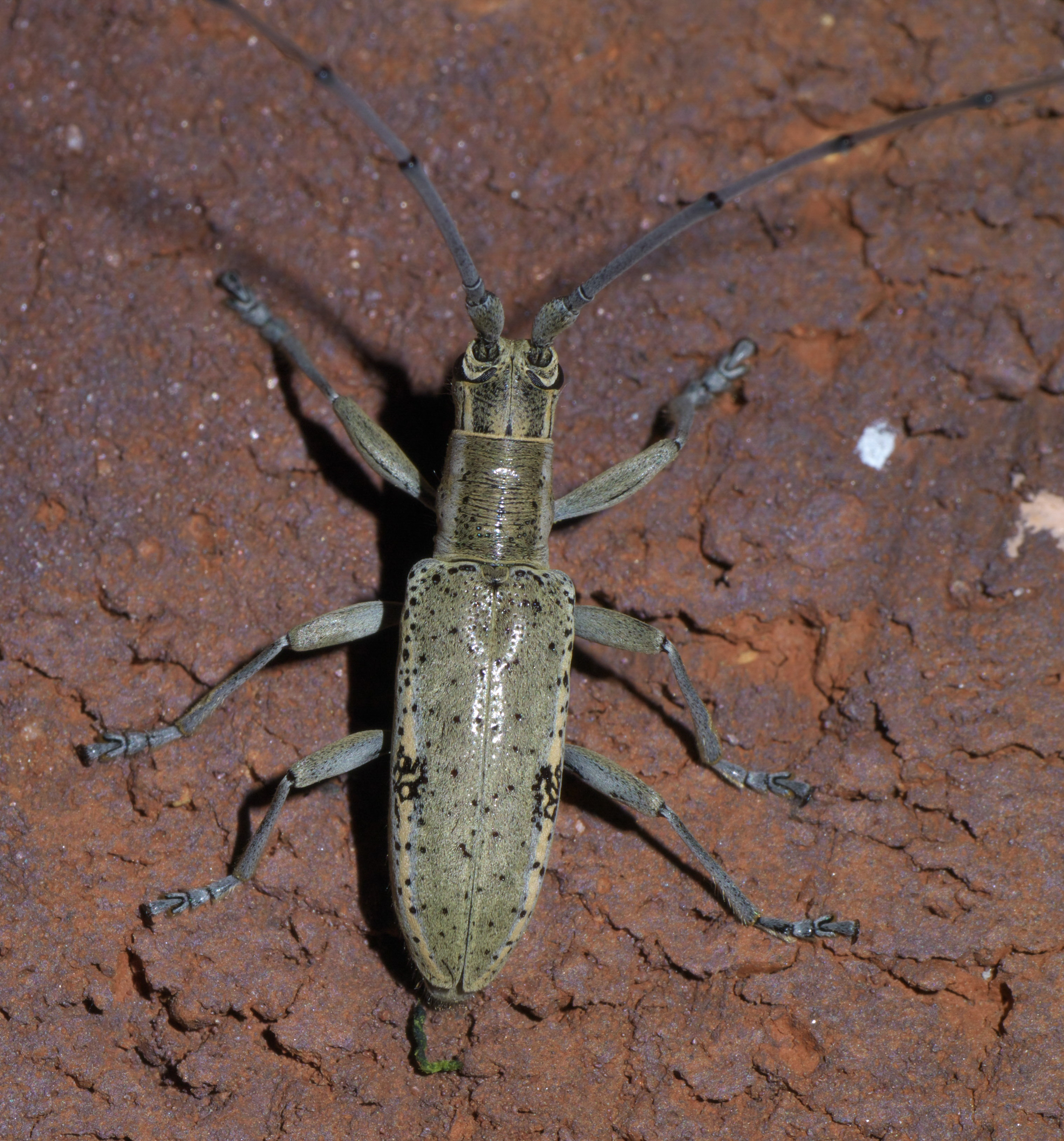
Dorcaschema wildii, mulberry borer

Dorcaschema wildii, the mulberry borer, is a species of beetle in the family Cerambycidae. It was described by Uhler in 1855. It is known from the United States.
