= Microlenecamptus albonotatus =

Scientific classification
- Kingdom: Animalia
- Phylum: Arthropoda
- Class: Insecta
- Order: Coleoptera
- Suborder: Polyphaga
- Infraorder: Cucujiformia
- Family: Cerambycidae
- Genus: Microlenecamptus
- Species: M. albonotatus

Binomial name
- Microlenecamptus albonotatus (Pic, 1925)

Synonyms
- Cylindrepomus (Microlenecamptus) albonotatus Pic, 1925

Species of beetle

Microlenecamptus albonotatus is a species of beetle in the family Cerambycidae. It was described by Maurice Pic in 1925. It is known from Vietnam.
