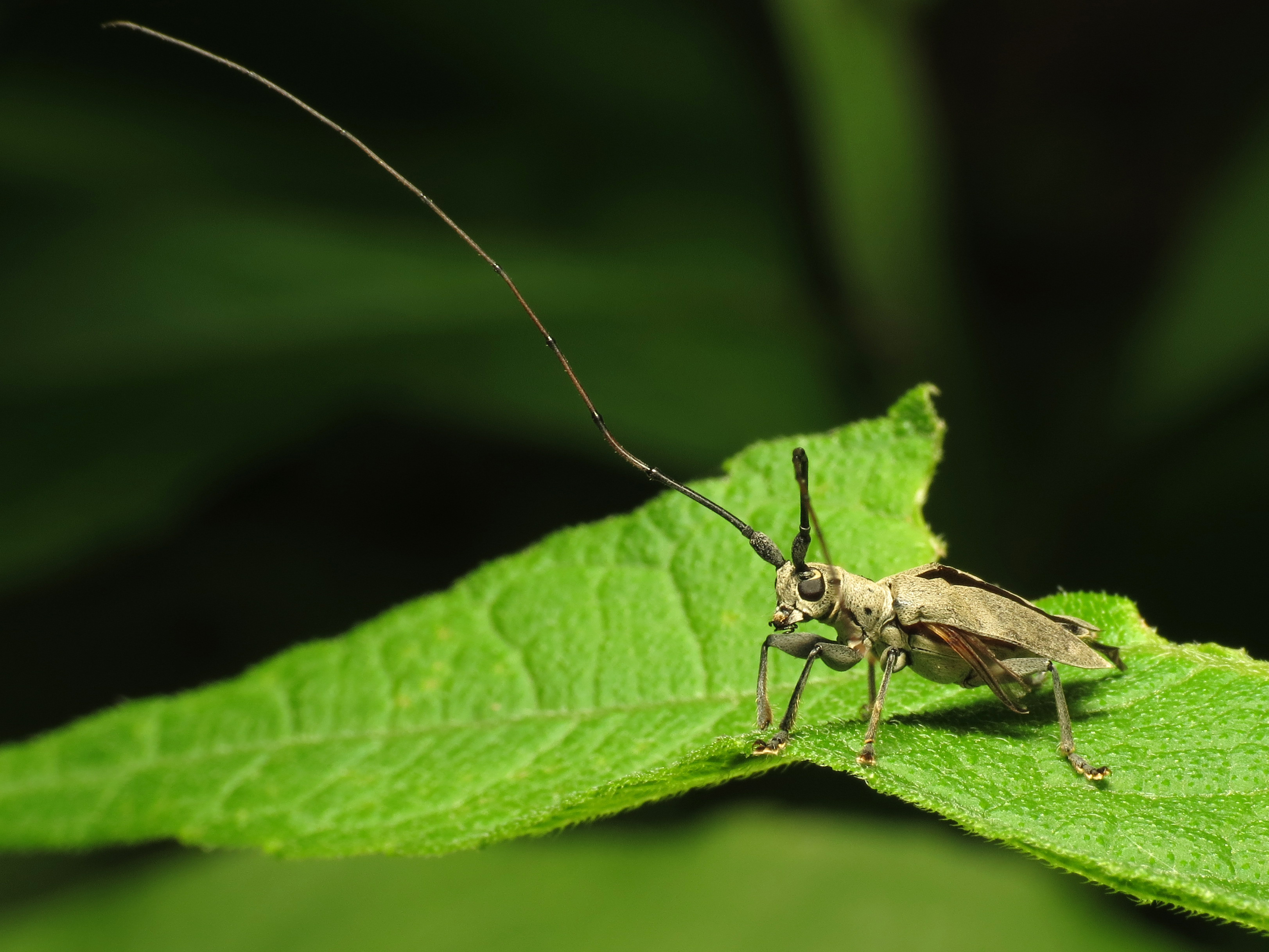

Scientific classification
- Kingdom: Animalia
- Phylum: Arthropoda
- Clade: Pancrustacea
- Class: Insecta
- Order: Coleoptera
- Suborder: Polyphaga
- Infraorder: Cucujiformia
- Family: Cerambycidae
- Genus: Dorcaschema
- Species: D. cinereum

Binomial name
- Dorcaschema cinereum (Olivier, 1795)

Synonyms
- Compsidea trilineata (Say) Haldeman, 1847; Hetoemis cinerea (Olivier) LeConte, 1852; Hetoemis cinerea bimaculata Dillon & Dillon, 1948; Hetoemis juglandis Haldeman, 1847; Hetoemis trilineata (Say) Thomson, 1860; Saperda 3-lineata Say, 1827; Saperda cinerea Olivier, 1795; Dorcaschema cinerea (Olivier) Chemsak, Linsley & Noguera, 1992 (misspelling); Hetoemis cineria (Olivier) Riley, 1880 (misspelling)

= Dorcaschema cinereum =

Species of beetle

Dorcaschema cinereum is a species of beetle in the family Cerambycidae. It was described by Guillaume-Antoine Olivier in 1795, originally under the genus Saperda. It is known from the United States.
