= Cylindrepomus sexplagiatus =

Scientific classification
- Kingdom: Animalia
- Phylum: Arthropoda
- Class: Insecta
- Order: Coleoptera
- Suborder: Polyphaga
- Infraorder: Cucujiformia
- Family: Cerambycidae
- Genus: Cylindrepomus
- Species: C. sexplagiatus

Binomial name
- Cylindrepomus sexplagiatus Breuning, 1936

Species of beetle

Cylindrepomus sexplagiatus is a species of beetle in the family Cerambycidae. It was described by Stephan von Breuning in 1936.
