= Cylindrepomus cyaneus =

Scientific classification
- Kingdom: Animalia
- Phylum: Arthropoda
- Class: Insecta
- Order: Coleoptera
- Suborder: Polyphaga
- Infraorder: Cucujiformia
- Family: Cerambycidae
- Genus: Cylindrepomus
- Species: C. cyaneus

Binomial name
- Cylindrepomus cyaneus Pic, 1924

Species of beetle

Cylindrepomus cyaneus is a species of beetle in the family Cerambycidae. It was described by Maurice Pic in 1924. It is found in Vietnam.
