= Cylindrepomus albicornis =

Scientific classification
- Kingdom: Animalia
- Phylum: Arthropoda
- Class: Insecta
- Order: Coleoptera
- Suborder: Polyphaga
- Infraorder: Cucujiformia
- Family: Cerambycidae
- Genus: Cylindrepomus
- Species: C. albicornis

Binomial name
- Cylindrepomus albicornis Nonfried, 1894

Species of beetle

Cylindrepomus albicornis is a species of beetle in the family Cerambycidae. It was described by Nonfried in 1894. It is known from the Sunda Islands.
