= Cylindrepomus laetus =

Scientific classification
- Kingdom: Animalia
- Phylum: Arthropoda
- Clade: Pancrustacea
- Class: Insecta
- Order: Coleoptera
- Suborder: Polyphaga
- Infraorder: Cucujiformia
- Family: Cerambycidae
- Genus: Cylindrepomus
- Species: C. laetus

Binomial name
- Cylindrepomus laetus Pascoe, 1858

Species of beetle

Cylindrepomus laetus is a species of beetle in the family Cerambycidae. It was described by Francis Polkinghorne Pascoe in 1858. It is known from Malaysia, Sumatra and Java. It contains the varietas Cylindrepomus laetus var. shelfordi.
