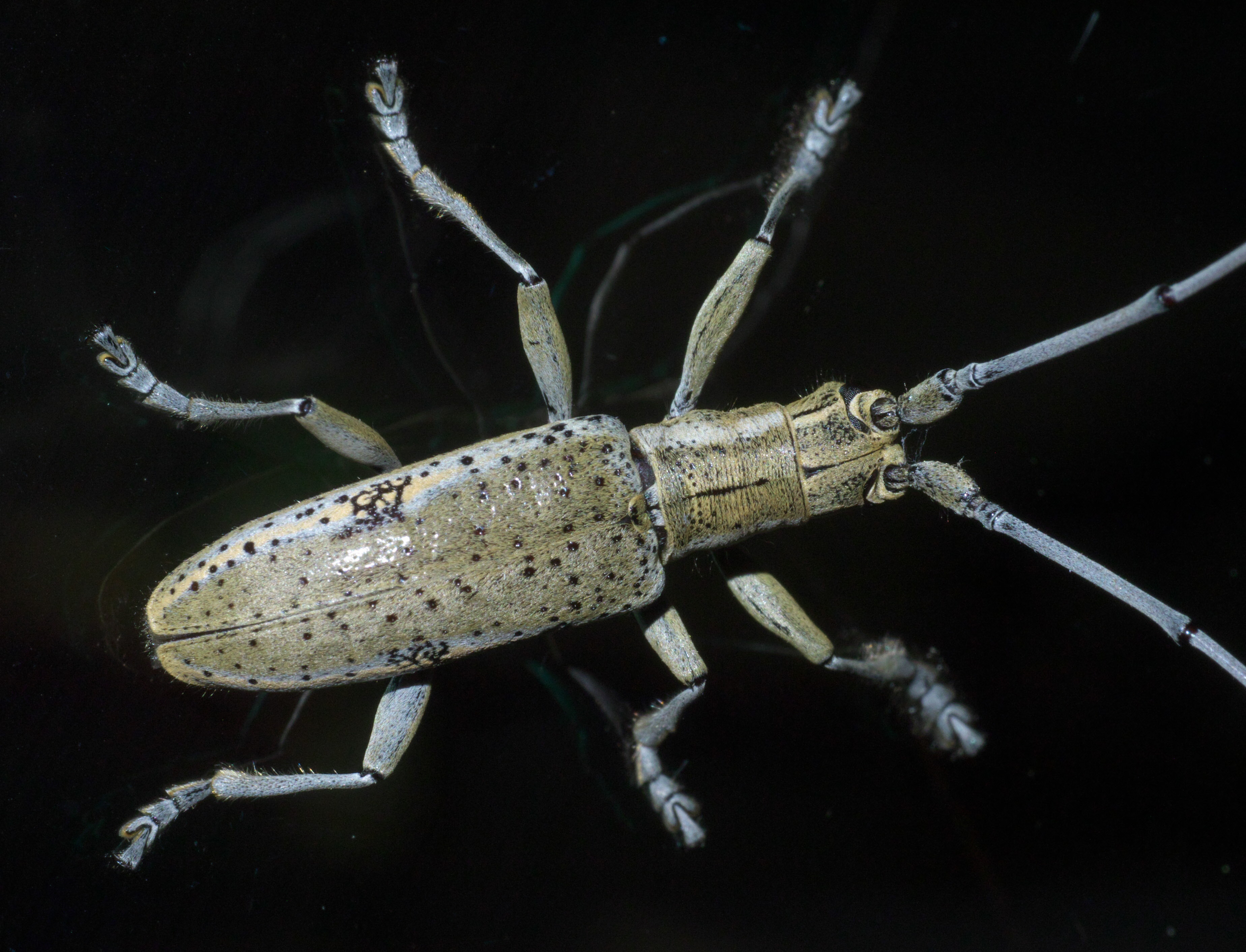
- Dorcaschema wildii

Scientific classification
- Kingdom: Animalia
- Phylum: Arthropoda
- Class: Insecta
- Order: Coleoptera
- Suborder: Polyphaga
- Infraorder: Cucujiformia
- Family: Cerambycidae
- Subfamily: Lamiinae
- Tribe: Dorcaschematini
- Genus: Dorcaschema; Chevrolat, 1844

Species
- Dorcaschema alternatum (Say, 1824); Dorcaschema cinereum (Olivier, 1795); Dorcaschema nigrum (Say, 1826); Dorcaschema succineum Zang, 1905 †; Dorcaschema wildii Uhler, 1855

= Dorcaschema =

Genus of beetles

Dorcaschema is a New World genus of longhorn beetles from the subfamily Lamiinae.
