= Microlenecamptus nakabayashii =

Scientific classification
- Domain: Eukaryota
- Kingdom: Animalia
- Phylum: Arthropoda
- Class: Insecta
- Order: Coleoptera
- Suborder: Polyphaga
- Infraorder: Cucujiformia
- Family: Cerambycidae
- Genus: Microlenecamptus
- Species: M. nakabayashii

Binomial name
- Microlenecamptus nakabayashii Takakuwa, 1992

Species of beetle

Microlenecamptus nakabayashii is a species of beetle in the family Cerambycidae. It was described by Takakuwa in 1992.
