= Cylindrepomus nigriceps =

Scientific classification
- Kingdom: Animalia
- Phylum: Arthropoda
- Clade: Pancrustacea
- Class: Insecta
- Order: Coleoptera
- Suborder: Polyphaga
- Infraorder: Cucujiformia
- Family: Cerambycidae
- Genus: Cylindrepomus
- Species: C. nigriceps

Binomial name
- Cylindrepomus nigriceps Franz, 1971

Species of beetle

Cylindrepomus nigriceps is a species of beetle in the family Cerambycidae. It was described by Franz in 1971. It is known from Sulawesi.
