= Cylindrepomus sexlineatus =

Scientific classification
- Kingdom: Animalia
- Phylum: Arthropoda
- Class: Insecta
- Order: Coleoptera
- Suborder: Polyphaga
- Infraorder: Cucujiformia
- Family: Cerambycidae
- Genus: Cylindrepomus
- Species: C. sexlineatus

Binomial name
- Cylindrepomus sexlineatus Schultze, 1934

Synonyms
- Cylindrepomus sexlineatus m. ininterruptus Breuning, 1950; Cylindrepomus sexlineatus m. reductevittatus Breuning, 1947

Species of beetle

Cylindrepomus sexlineatus is a species of beetle in the family Cerambycidae. It was described by Schultze in 1934. It is known from Borneo and the Philippines.
