= Cylindrepomus astyochus =

Scientific classification
- Domain: Eukaryota
- Kingdom: Animalia
- Phylum: Arthropoda
- Class: Insecta
- Order: Coleoptera
- Suborder: Polyphaga
- Infraorder: Cucujiformia
- Family: Cerambycidae
- Genus: Cylindrepomus
- Species: C. astyochus

Binomial name
- Cylindrepomus astyochus Dillon & Dillon, 1948

Species of beetle

Cylindrepomus astyochus is a species of beetle in the family Cerambycidae. It was described by Dillon and Dillon in 1948.
