= Cylindrepomus albovittatus =

Scientific classification
- Kingdom: Animalia
- Phylum: Arthropoda
- Class: Insecta
- Order: Coleoptera
- Suborder: Polyphaga
- Infraorder: Cucujiformia
- Family: Cerambycidae
- Genus: Cylindrepomus
- Species: C. albovittatus

Binomial name
- Cylindrepomus albovittatus Breuning, 1960

Species of beetle

Cylindrepomus albovittatus is a species of beetle in the family Cerambycidae. It was described by Stephan von Breuning in 1960. It is known from Borneo.
