= Cylindrepomus aureolineatus =

Scientific classification
- Kingdom: Animalia
- Phylum: Arthropoda
- Class: Insecta
- Order: Coleoptera
- Suborder: Polyphaga
- Infraorder: Cucujiformia
- Family: Cerambycidae
- Genus: Cylindrepomus
- Species: C. aureolineatus

Binomial name
- Cylindrepomus aureolineatus Dillon & Dillon, 1948

Species of beetle

Cylindrepomus aureolineatus is a species of beetle in the family Cerambycidae. It was described by Dillon and Dillon in 1948. It is known from Borneo.
