= Cylindrepomus fouqueti =

Scientific classification
- Kingdom: Animalia
- Phylum: Arthropoda
- Class: Insecta
- Order: Coleoptera
- Suborder: Polyphaga
- Infraorder: Cucujiformia
- Family: Cerambycidae
- Genus: Cylindrepomus
- Species: C. fouqueti

Binomial name
- Cylindrepomus fouqueti (Pic, 1932)

Synonyms
- Cylindrepomus laosensis Breuning, 1936; Olenecamptus fouqueti Pic, 1932

Species of beetle

Cylindrepomus fouqueti is a species of beetle in the family Cerambycidae. It was described by Maurice Pic in 1932, originally under the genus Olenecamptus.
