= Macrocamptus =

Scientific classification
- Domain: Eukaryota
- Kingdom: Animalia
- Phylum: Arthropoda
- Class: Insecta
- Order: Coleoptera
- Suborder: Polyphaga
- Infraorder: Cucujiformia
- Family: Cerambycidae
- Subfamily: Lamiinae
- Tribe: Dorcaschematini
- Genus: Macrocamptus; Dillon & Dillon, 1948

Type species
- Cylindrepomus virgatus Gahan, 1890

Genus of beetles

Macrocamptus is a genus of longhorn beetles of the subfamily Lamiinae, containing the following species:

- Macrocamptus andamanicus (Gardner, 1930)
- Macrocamptus virgatus (Gahan, 1890)
