= Cylindrepomus peregrinus =

Scientific classification
- Domain: Eukaryota
- Kingdom: Animalia
- Phylum: Arthropoda
- Class: Insecta
- Order: Coleoptera
- Suborder: Polyphaga
- Infraorder: Cucujiformia
- Family: Cerambycidae
- Genus: Cylindrepomus
- Species: C. peregrinus

Binomial name
- Cylindrepomus peregrinus Pascoe, 1858

Synonyms
- Cylindrepomus connexa Gilmour, 1950; Cylindrepomus samarensis Dillon & Dillon, 1948

Species of beetle

Cylindrepomus peregrinus is a species of beetle in the family Cerambycidae. It was described by Francis Polkinghorne Pascoe in 1858.

== Subspecies ==
- Cylindrepomus peregrinus peregrinus Pascoe, 1858
- Cylindrepomus peregrinus samarensis Dillon & Dillon, 1948
