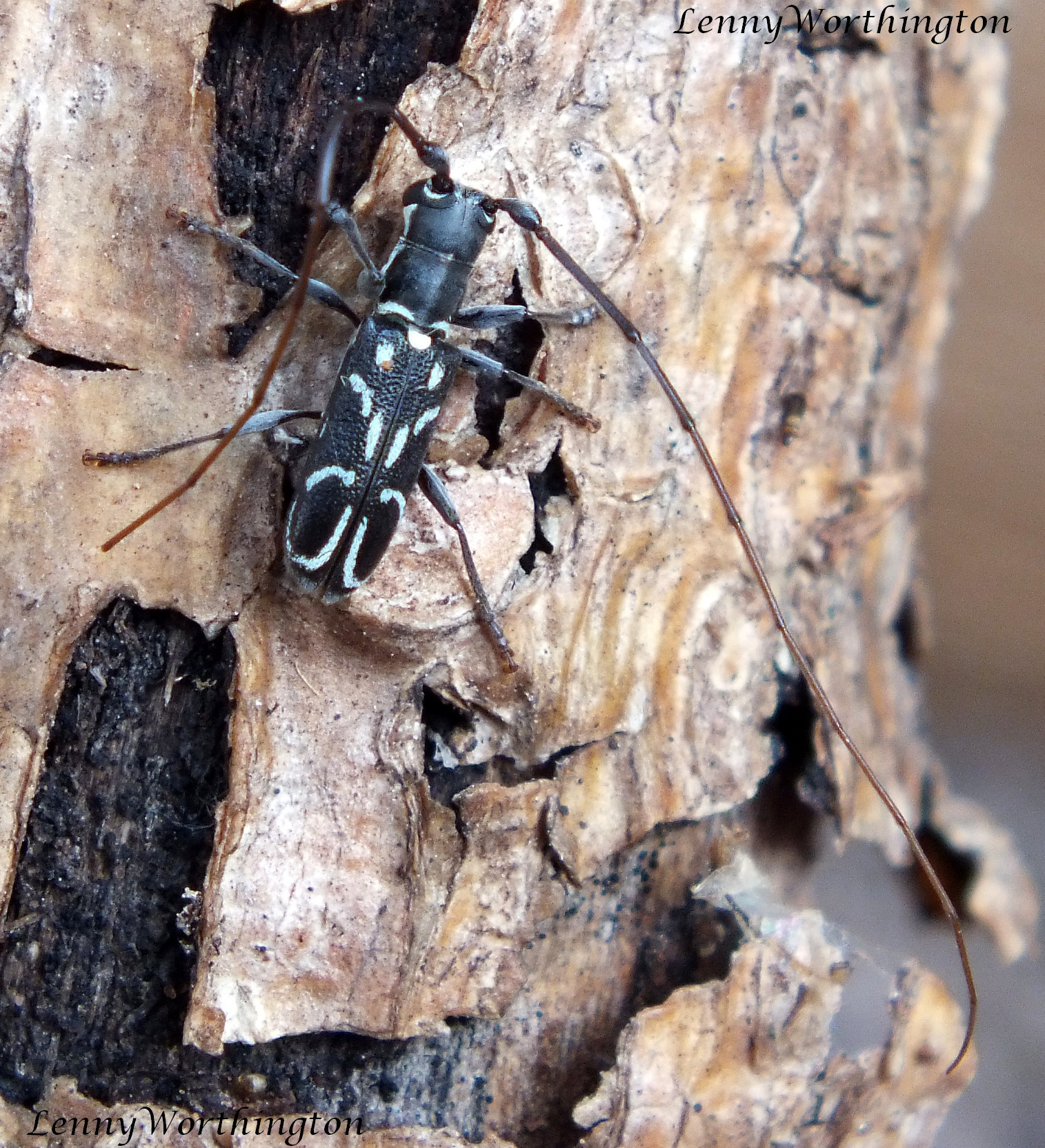
- Microlenecamptus signatus

Scientific classification
- Kingdom: Animalia
- Phylum: Arthropoda
- Class: Insecta
- Order: Coleoptera
- Suborder: Polyphaga
- Infraorder: Cucujiformia
- Family: Cerambycidae
- Genus: Microlenecamptus

= Microlenecamptus =

Genus of beetles

Microlenecamptus is a genus of longhorn beetles of the subfamily Lamiinae, containing the following species:

- Microlenecamptus albonotatus (Pic, 1925)
- Microlenecamptus biocellatus (Schwarzer, 1925)
- Microlenecamptus nakabayashii Takakuwa, 1992
- Microlenecamptus obsoletus (Fairmaire, 1888)
- Microlenecamptus signatus (Aurivillius, 1914)
