= Falsocularia =

Scientific classification
- Kingdom: Animalia
- Phylum: Arthropoda
- Class: Insecta
- Order: Coleoptera
- Suborder: Polyphaga
- Infraorder: Cucujiformia
- Family: Cerambycidae
- Genus: Falsocularia
- Species: F. annulicornis

Binomial name
- Falsocularia annulicornis Breuning, 1942

Genus of beetles

Falsocularia annulicornis is a species of beetle in the family Cerambycidae, and the only species in the genus Falsocularia. It was described by Breuning in 1942.
