= Cylindrepomus =

Scientific classification
- Kingdom: Animalia
- Phylum: Arthropoda
- Class: Insecta
- Order: Coleoptera
- Suborder: Polyphaga
- Infraorder: Cucujiformia
- Family: Cerambycidae
- Tribe: Dorcaschematini
- Genus: Cylindrepomus; Blanchard, 1853

Genus of beetles

Cylindrepomus is a genus of longhorn beetles of the subfamily Lamiinae, containing the following species:

- Cylindrepomus albicornis Nonfried, 1894
- Cylindrepomus albomaculatus Breuning, 1947
- Cylindrepomus albopictus Breuning, 1938
- Cylindrepomus albosignatus Breuning, 1947
- Cylindrepomus albovittatus Breuning, 1960
- Cylindrepomus astyochus Dillon & Dillon, 1948
- Cylindrepomus atropos Dillon & Dillon, 1948
- Cylindrepomus aureolineatus Dillon & Dillon, 1948
- Cylindrepomus ballerioi Vitali, 2000
- Cylindrepomus bayanii Hüdepohl, 1987
- Cylindrepomus biconjunctus Breuning, 1940
- Cylindrepomus bilineatus Schwarzer, 1926
- Cylindrepomus bivitticollis Breuning, 1947
- Cylindrepomus bivittipennis Breuning, 1955
- Cylindrepomus cicindeloides Schwarzer, 1926
- Cylindrepomus comis Pascoe, 1858
- Cylindrepomus cyaneus Pic, 1924
- Cylindrepomus elisabethae Hüdepohl, 1987
- Cylindrepomus filiformis Breuning, 1938
- Cylindrepomus flavicollis Breuning, 1947
- Cylindrepomus flavipennis Breuning, 1947
- Cylindrepomus flavosignatus Breuning, 1947
- Cylindrepomus flavus Breuning, 1947
- Cylindrepomus fouqueti (Pic, 1932)
- Cylindrepomus grammicus Pascoe, 1860
- Cylindrepomus hayashi Hüdepohl, 1987
- Cylindrepomus javanicus Breuning, 1936
- Cylindrepomus laetus Pascoe, 1858
- Cylindrepomus malaccensis Breuning, 1936
- Cylindrepomus mantiformis Hüdepohl, 1989
- Cylindrepomus mucronatus Schwarzer, 1926
- Cylindrepomus nigriceps Franz, 1971
- Cylindrepomus nigrofasciatus Blanchard, 1853
- Cylindrepomus peregrinus Pascoe, 1858
- Cylindrepomus rubriceps (Aurivillius, 1907)
- Cylindrepomus rufofemoratus Breuning, 1947
- Cylindrepomus sexlineatus Schultze, 1934
- Cylindrepomus sexplagiatus Breuning, 1936
- Cylindrepomus spinosus Hüdepohl, 1990
- Cylindrepomus uniformis Breuning, 1938
- Cylindrepomus viridipennis (Pic, 1937)
- Cylindrepomus vittatus (Pic, 1925)
- Cylindrepomus ysmaeli Hüdepohl, 1987
