= Epepeotes ceramensis =

Scientific classification
- Kingdom: Animalia
- Phylum: Arthropoda
- Class: Insecta
- Order: Coleoptera
- Suborder: Polyphaga
- Infraorder: Cucujiformia
- Family: Cerambycidae
- Genus: Epepeotes
- Species: E. ceramensis

Binomial name
- Epepeotes ceramensis (Thomson, 1860)

Synonyms
- Rhamses ceramensis Thomson, 1860

Species of beetle

Epepeotes ceramensis is a species of beetle in the family Cerambycidae. It was described by James Thomson in 1860. It is known from Moluccas.
