= Epepeotes vestigialis =

Scientific classification
- Domain: Eukaryota
- Kingdom: Animalia
- Phylum: Arthropoda
- Class: Insecta
- Order: Coleoptera
- Suborder: Polyphaga
- Infraorder: Cucujiformia
- Family: Cerambycidae
- Tribe: Lamiini
- Genus: Epepeotes
- Species: E. vestigialis

Binomial name
- Epepeotes vestigialis Pascoe, 1866

Species of beetle

Epepeotes vestigialis is a species of beetle in the family Cerambycidae. It was described by Francis Polkinghorne Pascoe in 1866.

== Subspecies ==
- Epepeotes vestigialis diverseglabratus (Pic, 1943)
- Epepeotes vestigialis vestigialis Pascoe, 1866
