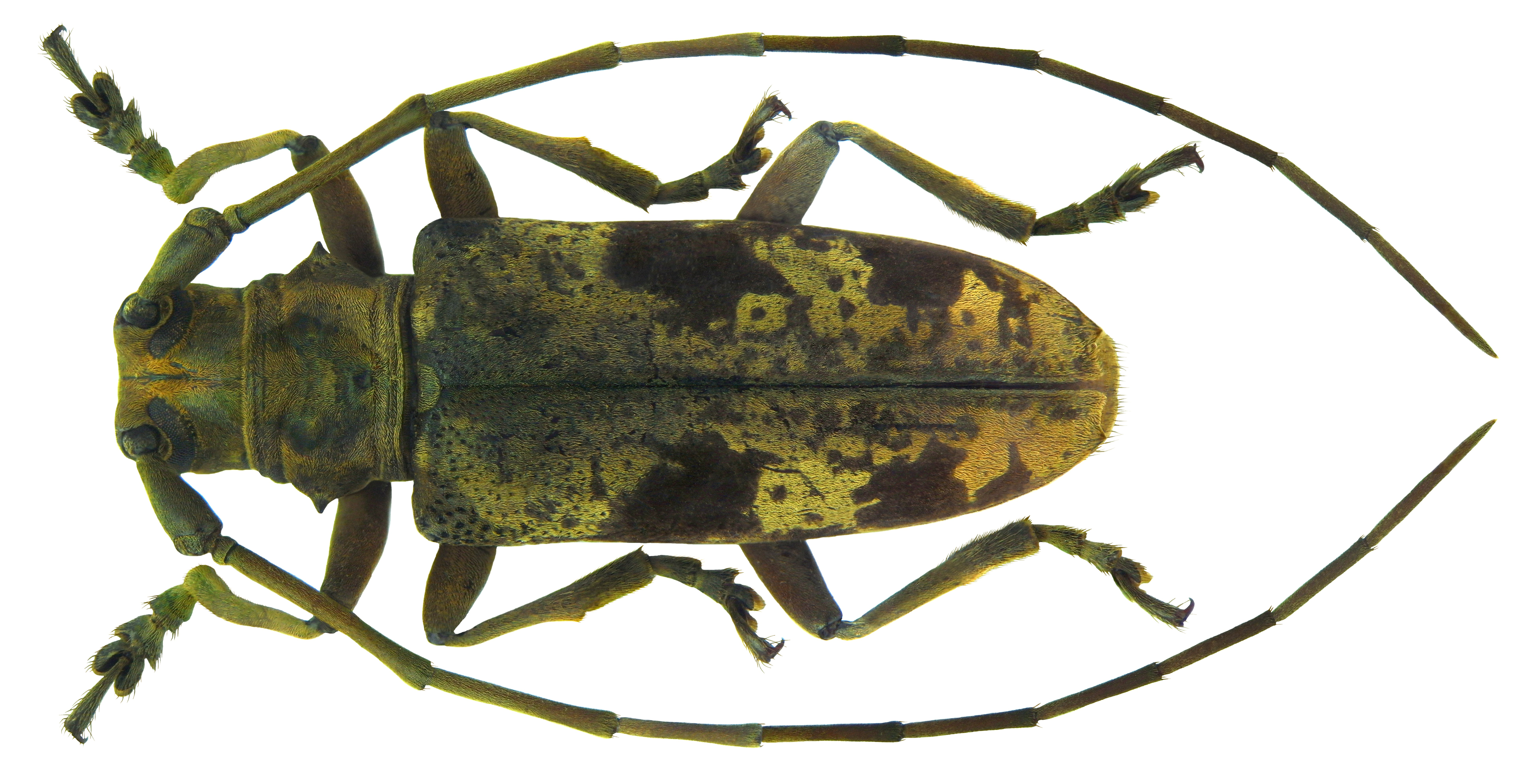

Scientific classification
- Domain: Eukaryota
- Kingdom: Animalia
- Phylum: Arthropoda
- Class: Insecta
- Order: Coleoptera
- Suborder: Polyphaga
- Infraorder: Cucujiformia
- Family: Cerambycidae
- Tribe: Lamiini
- Genus: Epepeotes
- Species: E. diversus

Binomial name
- Epepeotes diversus Pascoe, 1866

= Epepeotes diversus =

Species of beetle

Epepeotes diversus is a species of beetle in the family Cerambycidae. It was described by Francis Polkinghorne Pascoe in 1866.
