= Epepeotes andamanicus =

Scientific classification
- Domain: Eukaryota
- Kingdom: Animalia
- Phylum: Arthropoda
- Class: Insecta
- Order: Coleoptera
- Suborder: Polyphaga
- Infraorder: Cucujiformia
- Family: Cerambycidae
- Tribe: Lamiini
- Genus: Epepeotes
- Species: E. andamanicus

Binomial name
- Epepeotes andamanicus Gahan, 1893

Species of beetle

Epepeotes andamanicus is a species of beetle in the family Cerambycidae. It was described by Charles Joseph Gahan in 1893.
