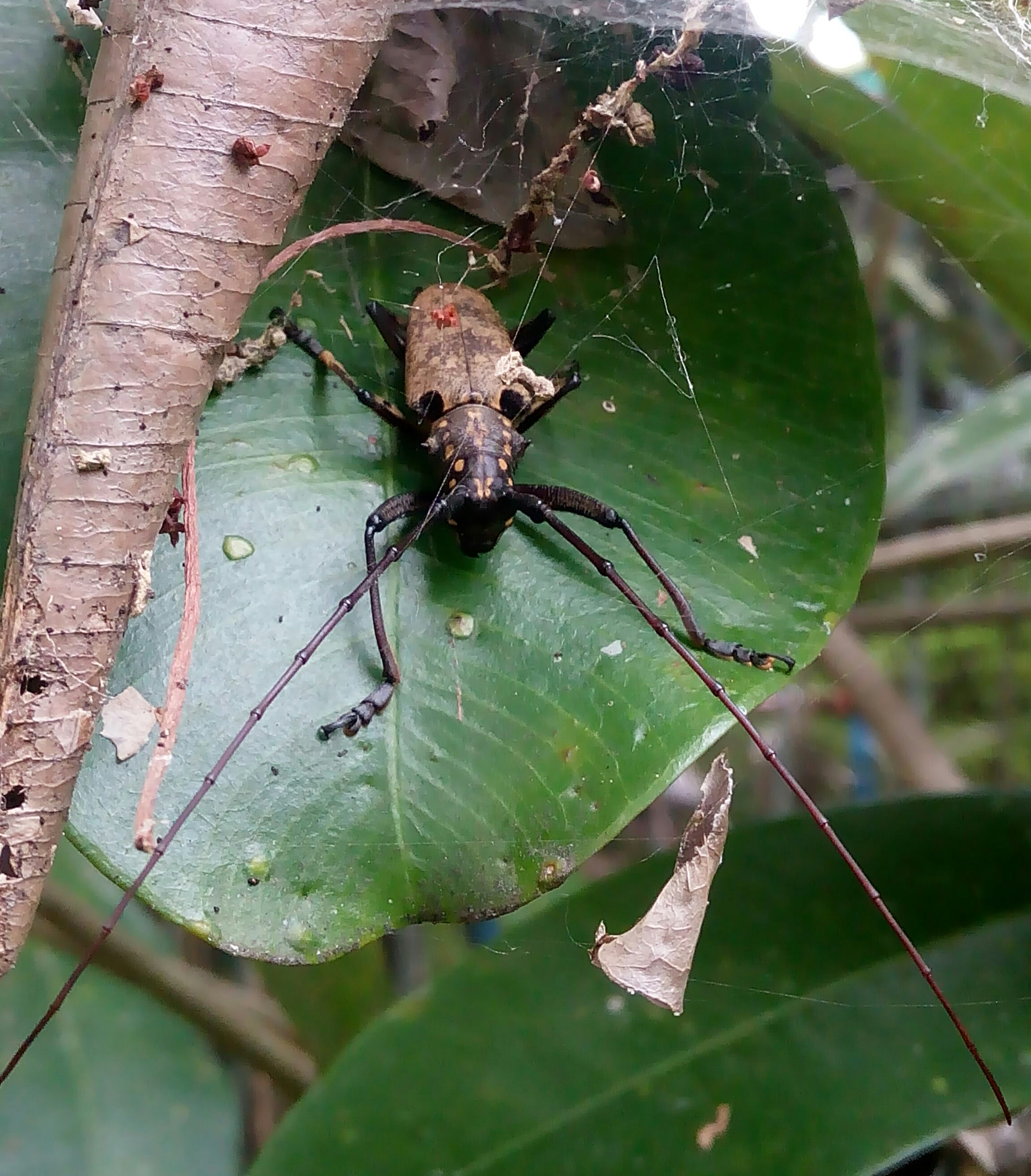

Scientific classification
- Kingdom: Animalia
- Phylum: Arthropoda
- Class: Insecta
- Order: Coleoptera
- Suborder: Polyphaga
- Infraorder: Cucujiformia
- Family: Cerambycidae
- Genus: Epepeotes
- Species: E. luscus

Binomial name
- Epepeotes luscus (Fabricius, 1787)

Synonyms
- Epepeotes alorensis Breuning, 1960; Lamia lusca Fabricius, 1787

= Epepeotes luscus =

Species of beetle

Epepeotes luscus is a species of beetle in the family Cerambycidae. It was described by Johan Christian Fabricius in 1787. It is known from Malaysia, China, Indonesia, Cambodia, Myanmar, the Nicobar and Solomon Islands, Laos, Thailand, India, and Vietnam. It feeds on Mangifera indica.

== Subspecies ==
- Epepeotes luscus densemaculatus Breuning, 1943
- Epepeotes luscus floresicus Breuning, 1974

== Varietas ==
- Epepeotes luscus var. enganensis Gahan, 1907
- Epepeotes luscus var. flavomaculatus Aurivillius, 1924
- Epepeotes luscus var. fumosus Pascoe, 1866
- Epepeotes luscus var. interruptus Breuning, 1943
- Epepeotes luscus var. ochreosticticus Breuning, 1943
- Epepeotes luscus var. soembanicus Schwarzer, 1931
