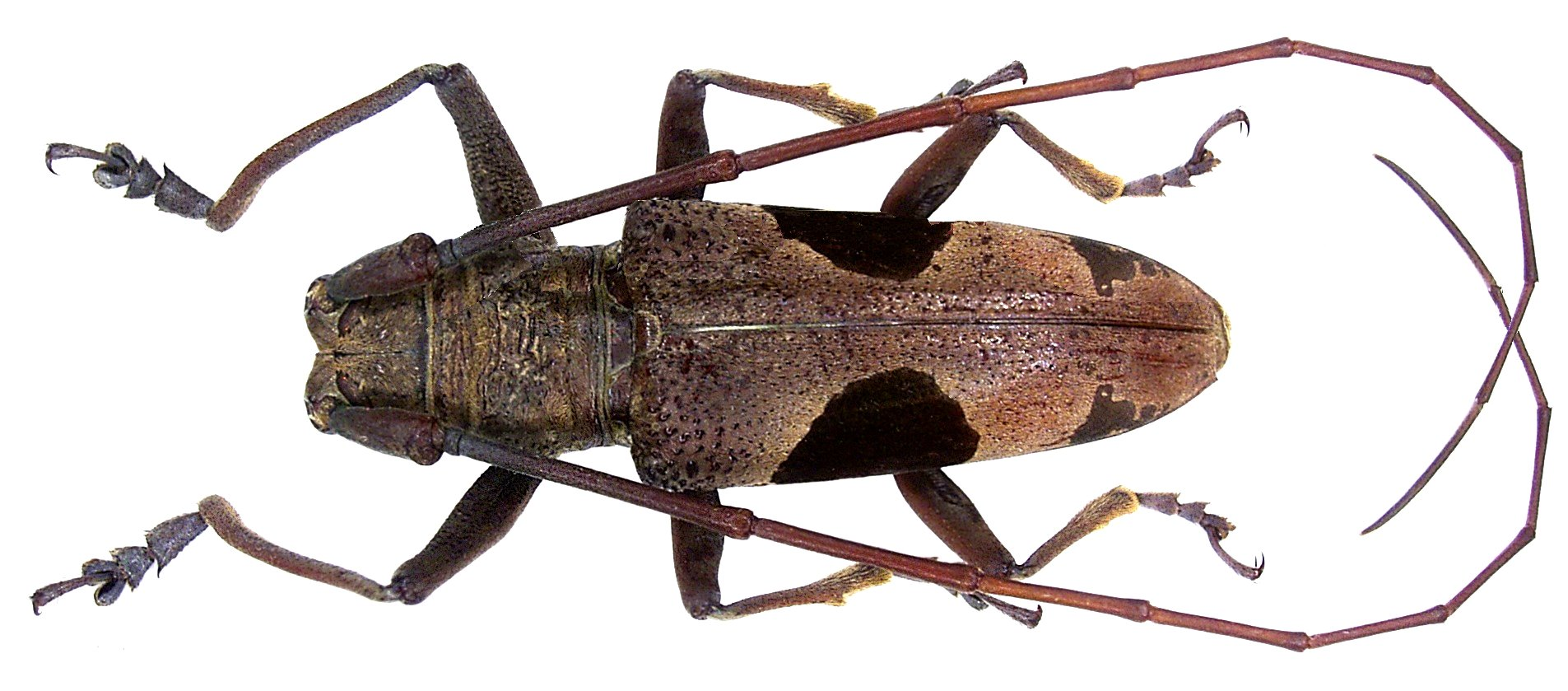

Scientific classification
- Kingdom: Animalia
- Phylum: Arthropoda
- Clade: Pancrustacea
- Class: Insecta
- Order: Coleoptera
- Suborder: Polyphaga
- Infraorder: Cucujiformia
- Family: Cerambycidae
- Genus: Epepeotes
- Species: E. lateralis

Binomial name
- Epepeotes lateralis (Guérin-Méneville, 1831)

Synonyms
- Epepeotes meridianus Pascoe, 1866; Epepeotes spinosus (Thomson) Gahan, 1888; Leprodera spinosa J. Thomson, 1857; Monohammus lateralis Guérin-Méneville, 1831

= Epepeotes lateralis =

Species of beetle

Epepeotes lateralis is a species of beetle in the family Cerambycidae. It was described by Félix Édouard Guérin-Méneville in 1831, originally under the genus Monohammus. It is known from Sulawesi, Malaysia, Java, and Sumatra.

== Subspecies ==
- Epepeotes lateralis lateralis (Guérin-Méneville, 1831)
- Epepeotes lateralis niasicus Aurivillius, 1932
