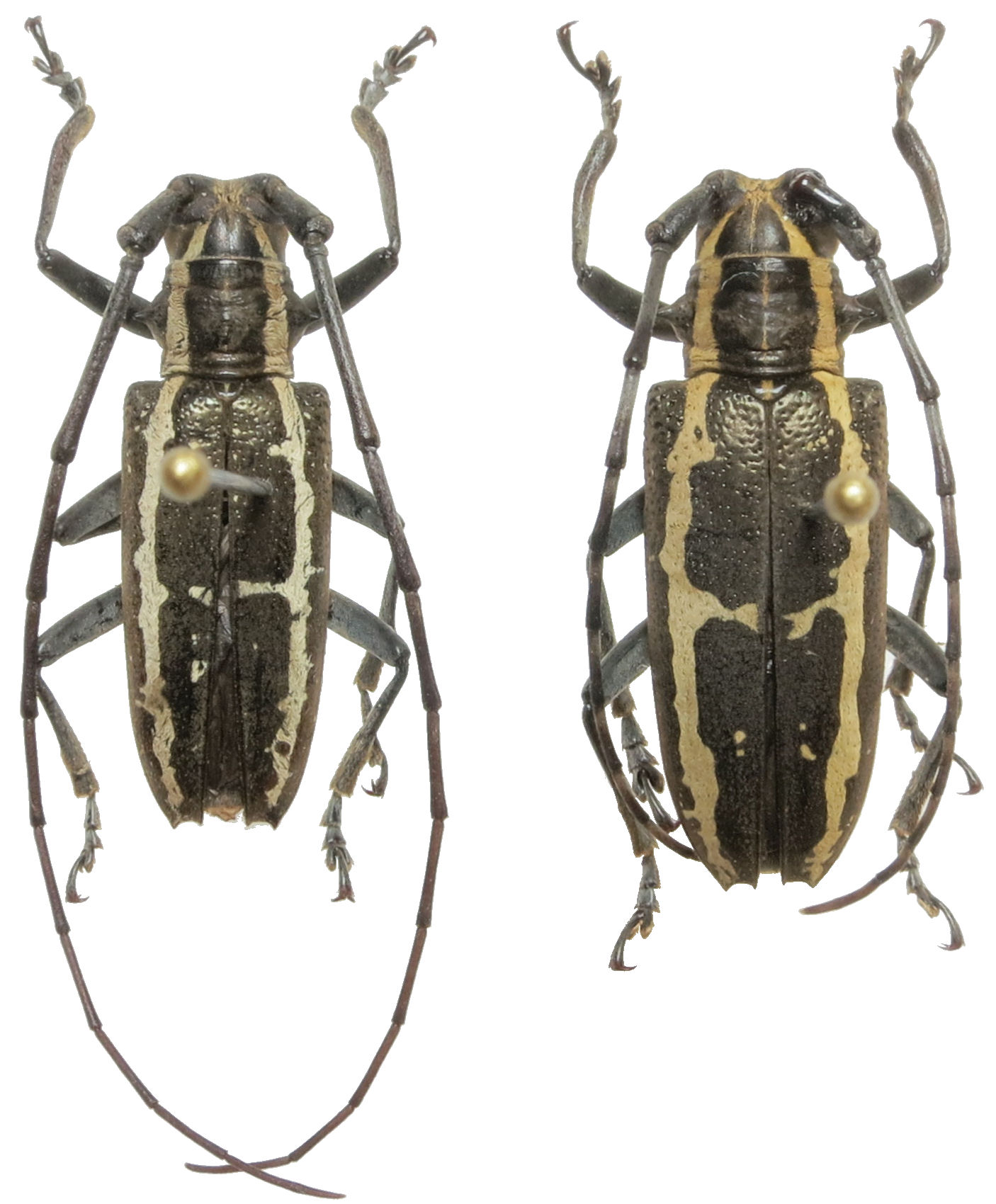
- Epepeotes ambigenus from Philippines

Scientific classification
- Domain: Eukaryota
- Kingdom: Animalia
- Phylum: Arthropoda
- Class: Insecta
- Order: Coleoptera
- Suborder: Polyphaga
- Infraorder: Cucujiformia
- Family: Cerambycidae
- Tribe: Lamiini
- Genus: Epepeotes
- Species: E. ambigenus

Binomial name
- Epepeotes ambigenus (Chevrolat, 1841)

Synonyms
- Diochares ambigenus Chevrolat, 1841; Monohammus ambigenus (Chevrolat, 1841)

= Epepeotes ambigenus =

Species of beetle

Epepeotes ambigenus is a species of beetle in the family Cerambycidae. It was described by Louis Alexandre Auguste Chevrolat in 1841. It is known from Taiwan and the Philippines. It feeds on Ficus carica and Ficus nota.

== Subspecies ==
- Epepeotes ambigenus ambigenus (Chevrolat, 1841)
- Epepeotes ambigenus formosanus Breuning, 1943
