= Epepeotes basigranatus =

Scientific classification
- Kingdom: Animalia
- Phylum: Arthropoda
- Class: Insecta
- Order: Coleoptera
- Suborder: Polyphaga
- Infraorder: Cucujiformia
- Family: Cerambycidae
- Genus: Epepeotes
- Species: E. basigranatus

Binomial name
- Epepeotes basigranatus (Fairmaire, 1883)

Species of beetle

Epepeotes basigranatus is a species of beetle in the family Cerambycidae. It was described by Léon Fairmaire in 1883.
