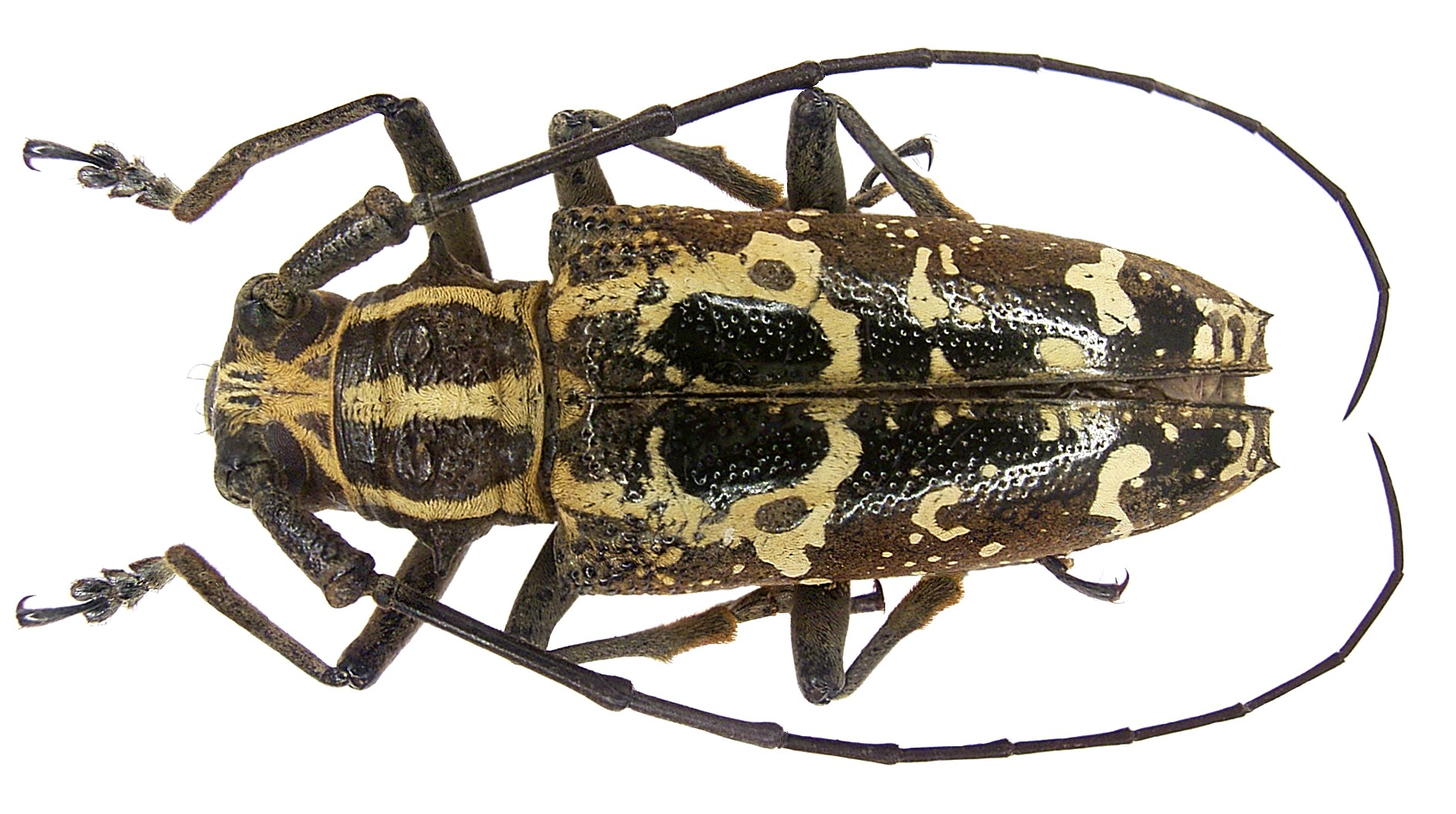
- A specimen of a Epepeotes desertus

Scientific classification
- Kingdom: Animalia
- Phylum: Arthropoda
- Class: Insecta
- Order: Coleoptera
- Suborder: Polyphaga
- Infraorder: Cucujiformia
- Family: Cerambycidae
- Genus: Epepeotes
- Species: E. desertus

Binomial name
- Epepeotes desertus (Linnaeus, 1758)

Synonyms
- Cerambyx desertus Linnaeus, 1758; Cerambyx fimbriatus Olivier, 1795; Diochares fimbriatus Bates, 1877; Diochares fimbriatus Pascoe, 1866; Lamia fimbriata Olivier, 1792; Lamia lineator Fabricius, 1801; Lamia lineator Zimsen, 1964

= Epepeotes desertus =

Species of beetle

Epepeotes desertus is a species of flat-faced longhorns beetle belonging to the family Cerambycidae, subfamily Lamiinae.

== Description ==
Epepeotes desertus reaches about 25 millimetres (0.98 in) in length.

== Distribution ==
This species can be found in Indonesia (Moluccas) and Philippines.

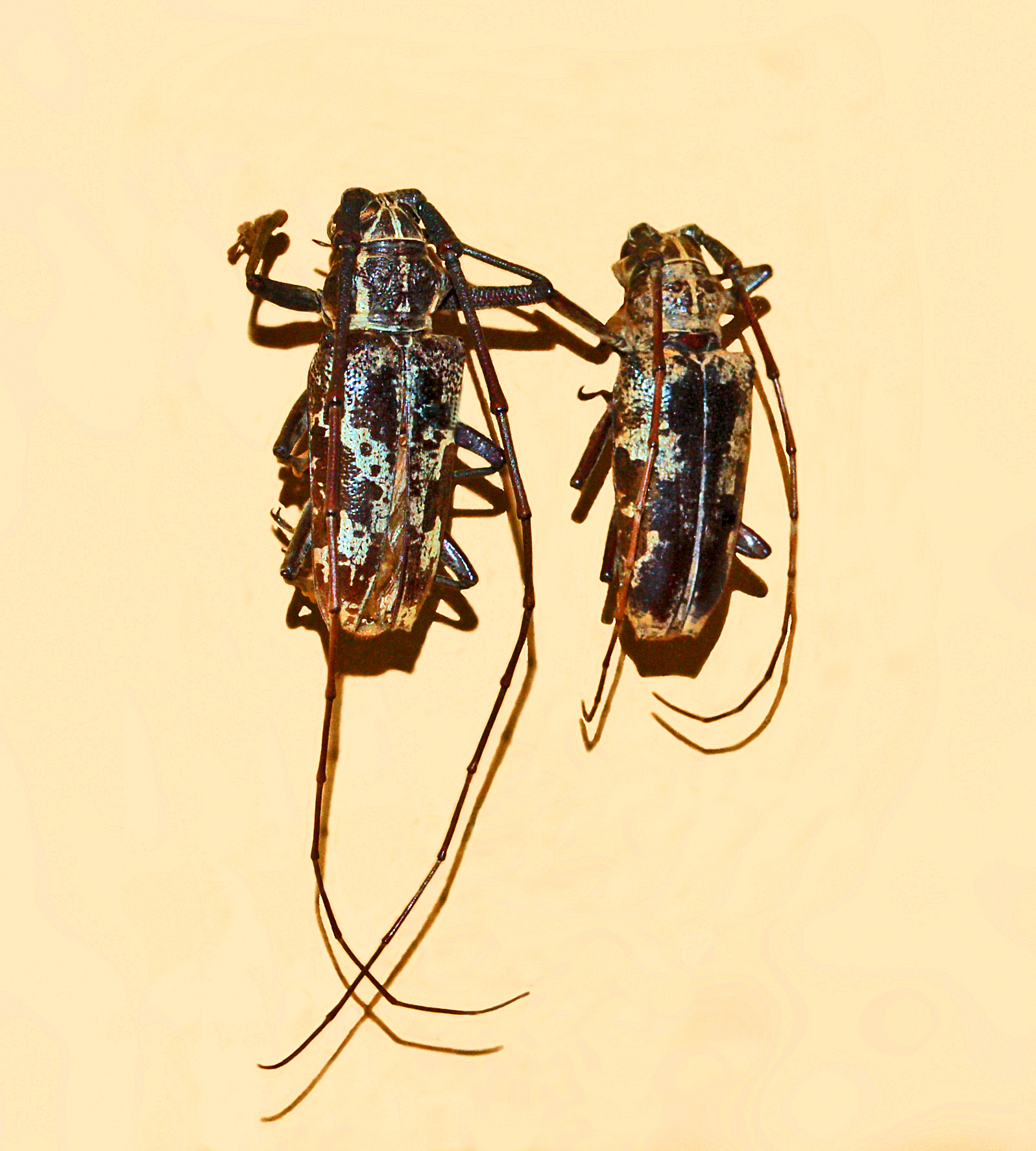
Epepeotes desertus from Ternate Island. Male and female

== List of subspecies ==
- Epepeotes desertus desertus (Linnaeus, 1758)
- Epepeotes desertus obscurus Aurivillius, 1926
- Epepeotes desertus rhobetor (Newman, 1842)
