= Epepeotes lugubris =

Scientific classification
- Kingdom: Animalia
- Phylum: Arthropoda
- Clade: Pancrustacea
- Class: Insecta
- Order: Coleoptera
- Suborder: Polyphaga
- Infraorder: Cucujiformia
- Family: Cerambycidae
- Genus: Epepeotes
- Species: E. lugubris

Binomial name
- Epepeotes lugubris (Pascoe, 1866)

Synonyms
- Diochares impluviatus Paxoe, 1866; Diochares lugubris Pascoe, 1866

Species of beetle

Epepeotes lugubris is a species of beetle in the family Cerambycidae. It was described by Francis Polkinghorne Pascoe in 1866, originally under the genus Diochares. It is known from Sulawesi.
