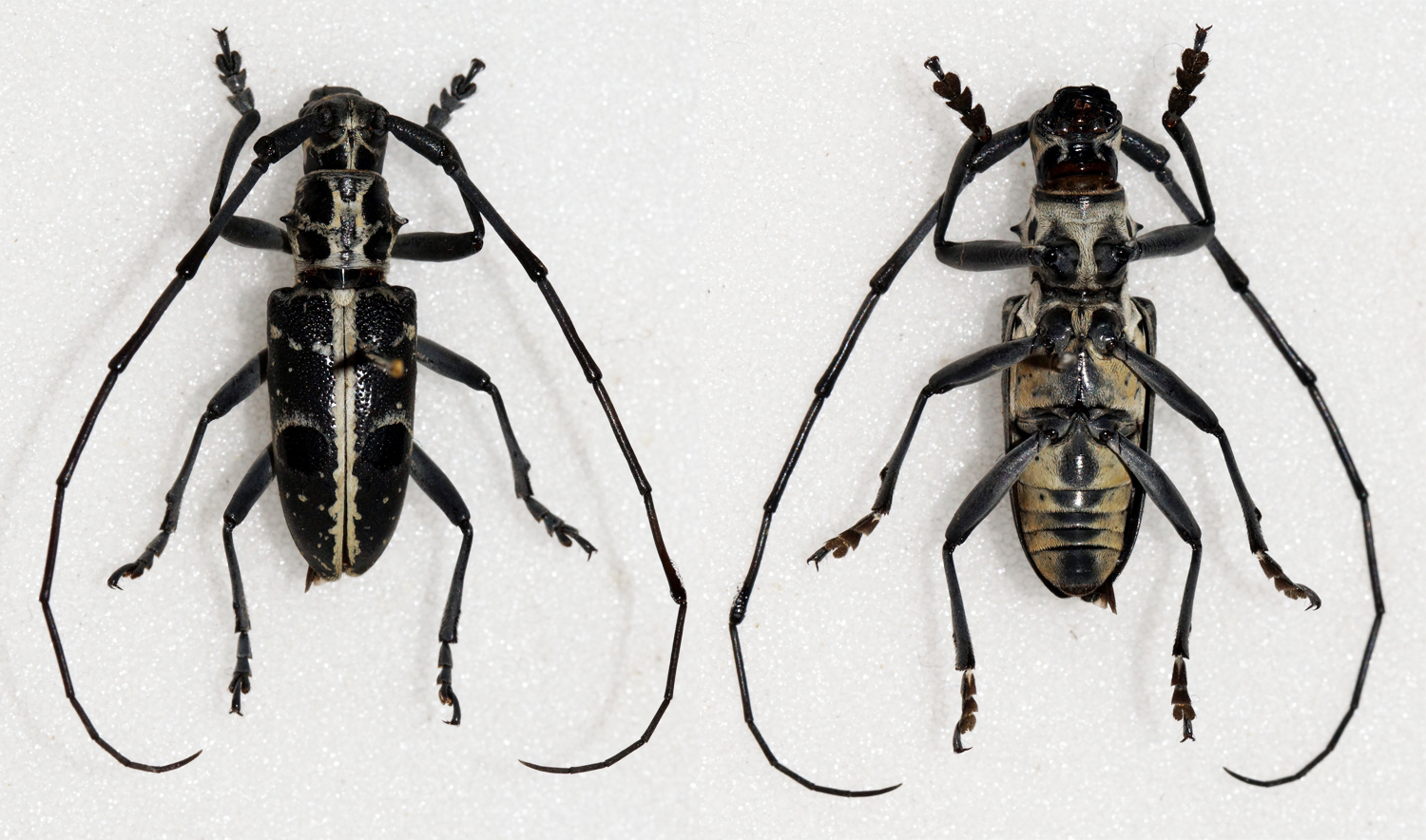

Scientific classification
- Kingdom: Animalia
- Phylum: Arthropoda
- Clade: Pancrustacea
- Class: Insecta
- Order: Coleoptera
- Suborder: Polyphaga
- Infraorder: Cucujiformia
- Family: Cerambycidae
- Genus: Epepeotes
- Species: E. meleagris

Binomial name
- Epepeotes meleagris (Pascoe, 1866)

Synonyms
- Pelargoderus meleagris Pascoe, 1866

= Epepeotes meleagris =

Species of beetle

Epepeotes meleagris is a species of beetle in the family Cerambycidae. It was described by Francis Polkinghorne Pascoe in 1866. It is known from Sulawesi and Moluccas.
