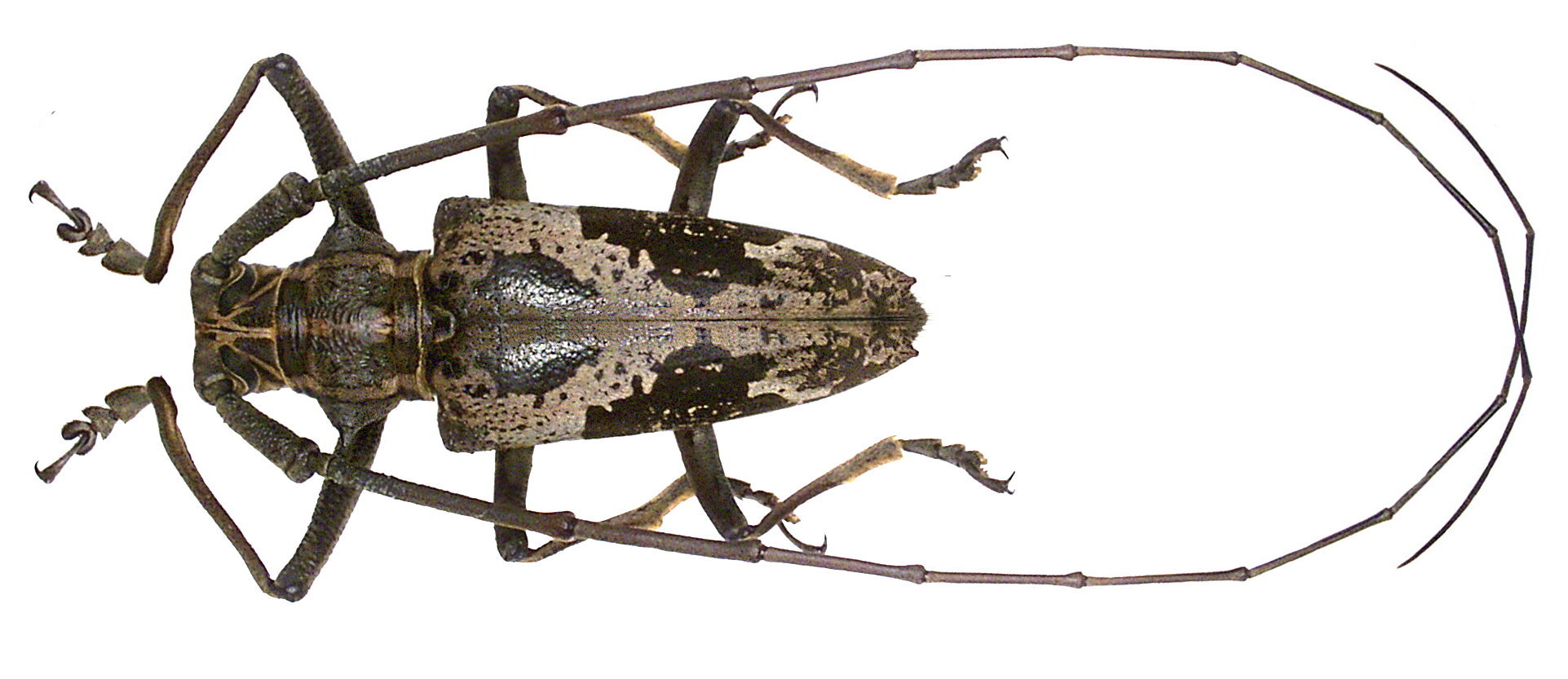
- Epepeotes taeniotinus

Scientific classification
- Kingdom: Animalia
- Phylum: Arthropoda
- Class: Insecta
- Order: Coleoptera
- Suborder: Polyphaga
- Infraorder: Cucujiformia
- Family: Cerambycidae
- Genus: Epepeotes
- Species: E. taeniotinus

Binomial name
- Epepeotes taeniotinus Heller, 1924

Synonyms
- Diochares desertus taeniotinus Heller, 1924

= Epepeotes taeniotinus =

Species of beetle

Epepeotes taeniotinus is a species of beetle in the family Cerambycidae. It was described by Heller in 1924. It is known from the Philippines and Moluccas.

== Subspecies ==
- Epepeotes taeniotinus gebehensis Breuning, 1974
- Epepeotes taeniotinus taeniotinus (Heller, 1924)
