= Epepeotes elongatus =

Scientific classification
- Domain: Eukaryota
- Kingdom: Animalia
- Phylum: Arthropoda
- Class: Insecta
- Order: Coleoptera
- Suborder: Polyphaga
- Infraorder: Cucujiformia
- Family: Cerambycidae
- Tribe: Lamiini
- Genus: Epepeotes
- Species: E. elongatus

Binomial name
- Epepeotes elongatus Hüdepohl, 1990

Species of beetle

Epepeotes elongatus is a species of beetle in the family Cerambycidae. It was described by Karl-Ernst Hüdepohl in 1990. It is known from Malaysia.
