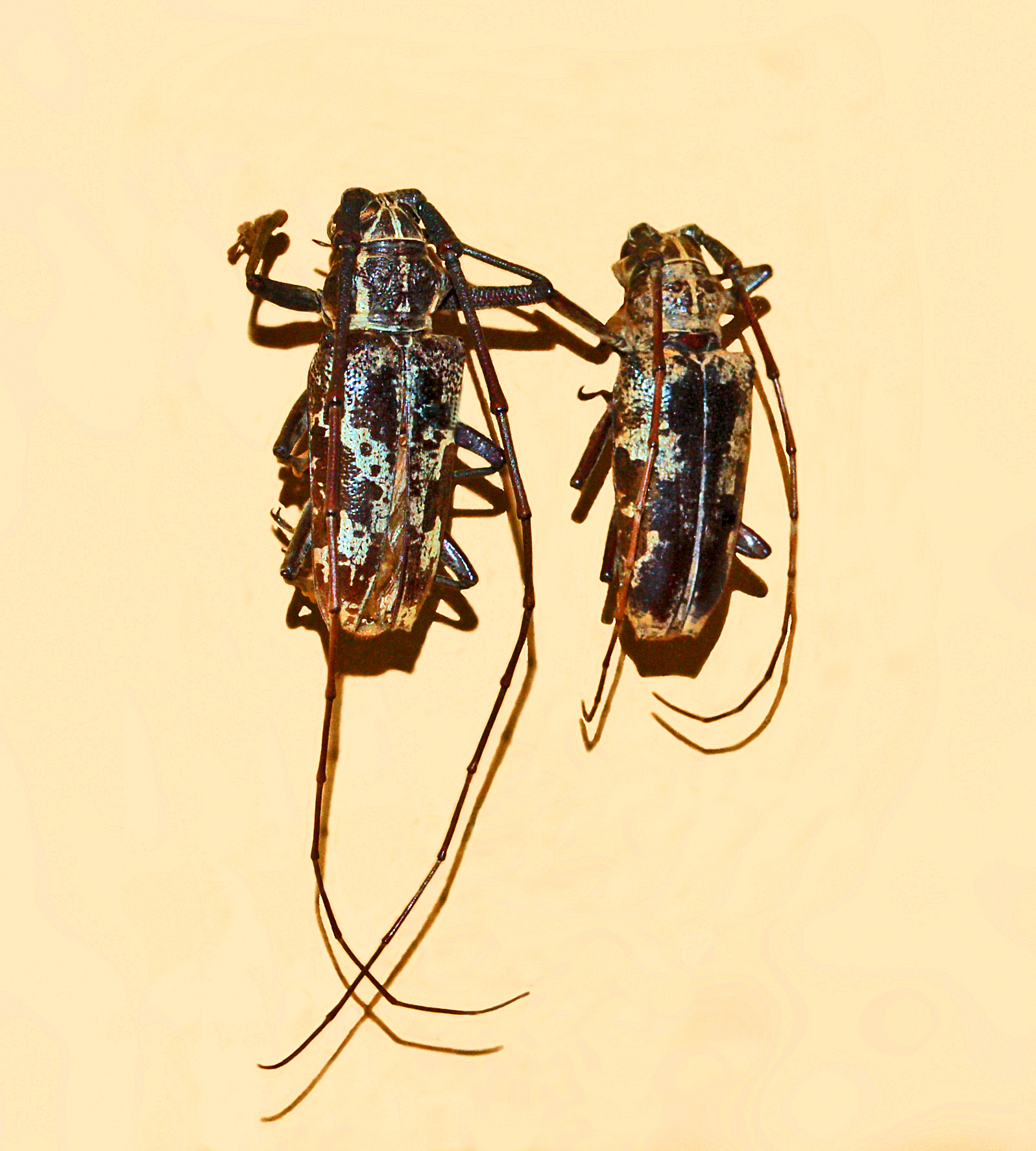
- Epepeotes desertus from Ternate Island. Male and female

Scientific classification
- Domain: Eukaryota
- Kingdom: Animalia
- Phylum: Arthropoda
- Class: Insecta
- Order: Coleoptera
- Suborder: Polyphaga
- Infraorder: Cucujiformia
- Family: Cerambycidae
- Tribe: Lamiini
- Genus: Epepeotes; Pascoe, 1866

Synonyms
- Falsomonochammus Pic, 1943; Mengelotes Dillon & Dillon, 1941; Diochares Pascoe, 1866

= Epepeotes =

Genus of beetles

Epepeotes is a genus of flat-faced longhorns beetle belonging to the family Cerambycidae, subfamily Lamiinae.

== List of species ==
- Epepeotes ambigenus (Chevrolat, 1841)
- Epepeotes andamanicus Gahan, 1893
- Epepeotes basigranatus (Fairmaire, 1883)
- Epepeotes birmanus Breuning, 1969
- Epepeotes ceramensis (Thomson, 1860)
- Epepeotes commixtus (Pascoe, 1859)
- Epepeotes desertus (Linnaeus, 1758)
- Epepeotes diversus Pascoe, 1866
- Epepeotes elongatus Hüdepohl, 1990
- Epepeotes fimbriatus Olivier, 1792
- Epepeotes gardneri Breuning, 1936
- Epepeotes himalayanus Breuning, 1950
- Epepeotes indistinctus Breuning, 1938
- Epepeotes integripennis Breuning, 1940
- Epepeotes jeanvoinei Pic, 1935
- Epepeotes laosicus Breuning, 1964
- Epepeotes lateralis (Guérin-Méneville, 1831)
- Epepeotes lugubris (Pascoe, 1866)
- Epepeotes luscus (Fabricius, 1787)
- Epepeotes meleagris (Pascoe, 1866)
- Epepeotes nicobaricus Breuning, 1960
- Epepeotes nitidus (Aurivillius, 1923)
- Epepeotes pictus Breuning, 1938
- Epepeotes plorator (Newman, 1842)
- Epepeotes schlegelii Lansberge, 1884
- Epepeotes strandi (Breuning, 1935)
- Epepeotes taeniotinus Heller, 1924
- Epepeotes timorensis Breuning, 1950
- Epepeotes uncinatus Gahan, 1888
- Epepeotes vestigialis Pascoe, 1866
