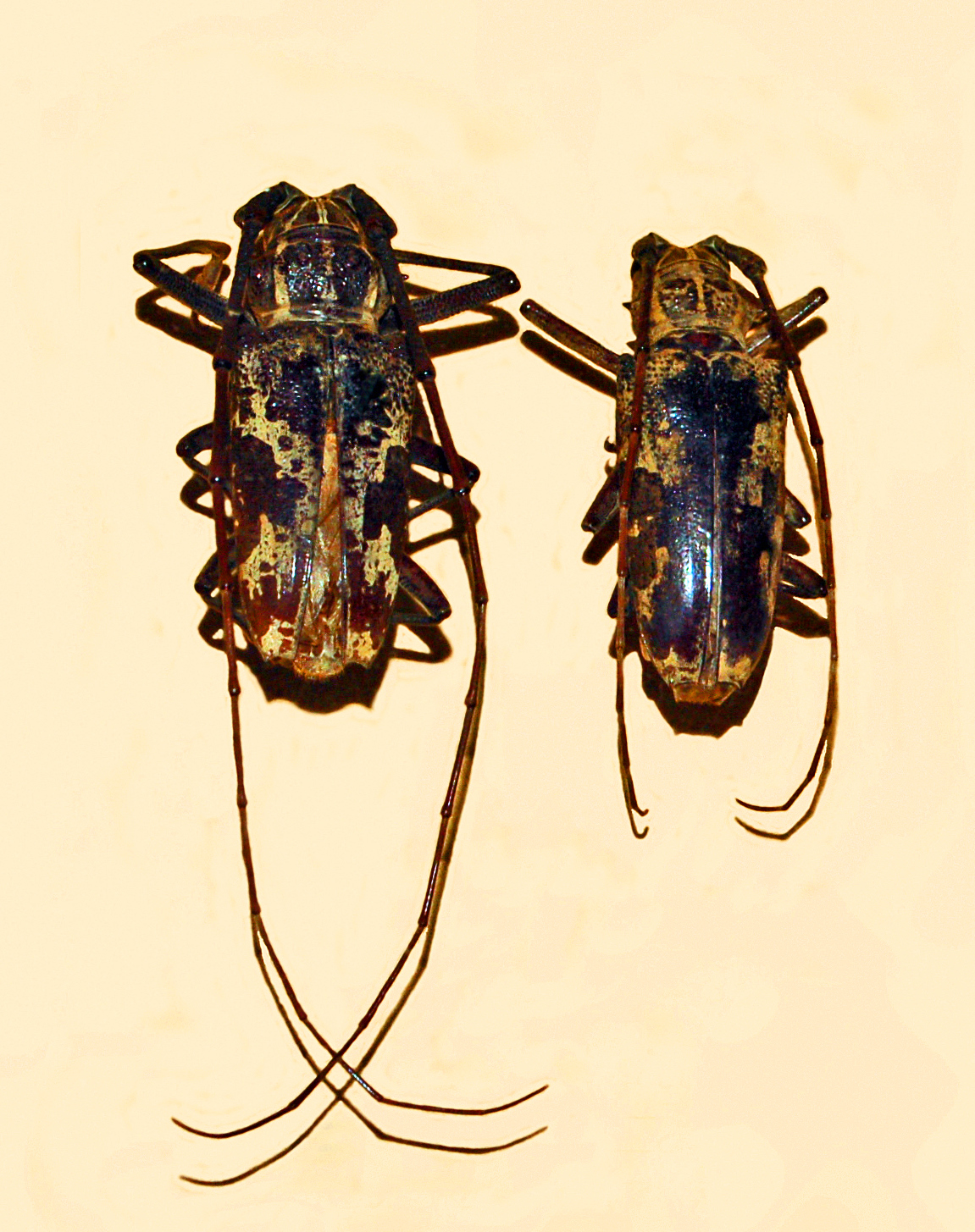
- Epepeotes fimbriatus from Ternate Island. Male and female

Scientific classification
- Kingdom: Animalia
- Phylum: Arthropoda
- Clade: Pancrustacea
- Class: Insecta
- Order: Coleoptera
- Suborder: Polyphaga
- Infraorder: Cucujiformia
- Family: Cerambycidae
- Genus: Epepeotes
- Species: E. fimbriatus

Binomial name
- Epepeotes fimbriatus Olivier, 1792

= Epepeotes fimbriatus =

Species of beetle

Epepeotes fimbriatus is a species of flat-faced longhorns beetle belonging to the family Cerambycidae, subfamily Lamiinae.

== Description ==
Epepeotes fimbriatus reaches about 25 millimetres (0.98 in) in length.

== Distribution ==
This species can be found in Indonesia (Moluccas).
