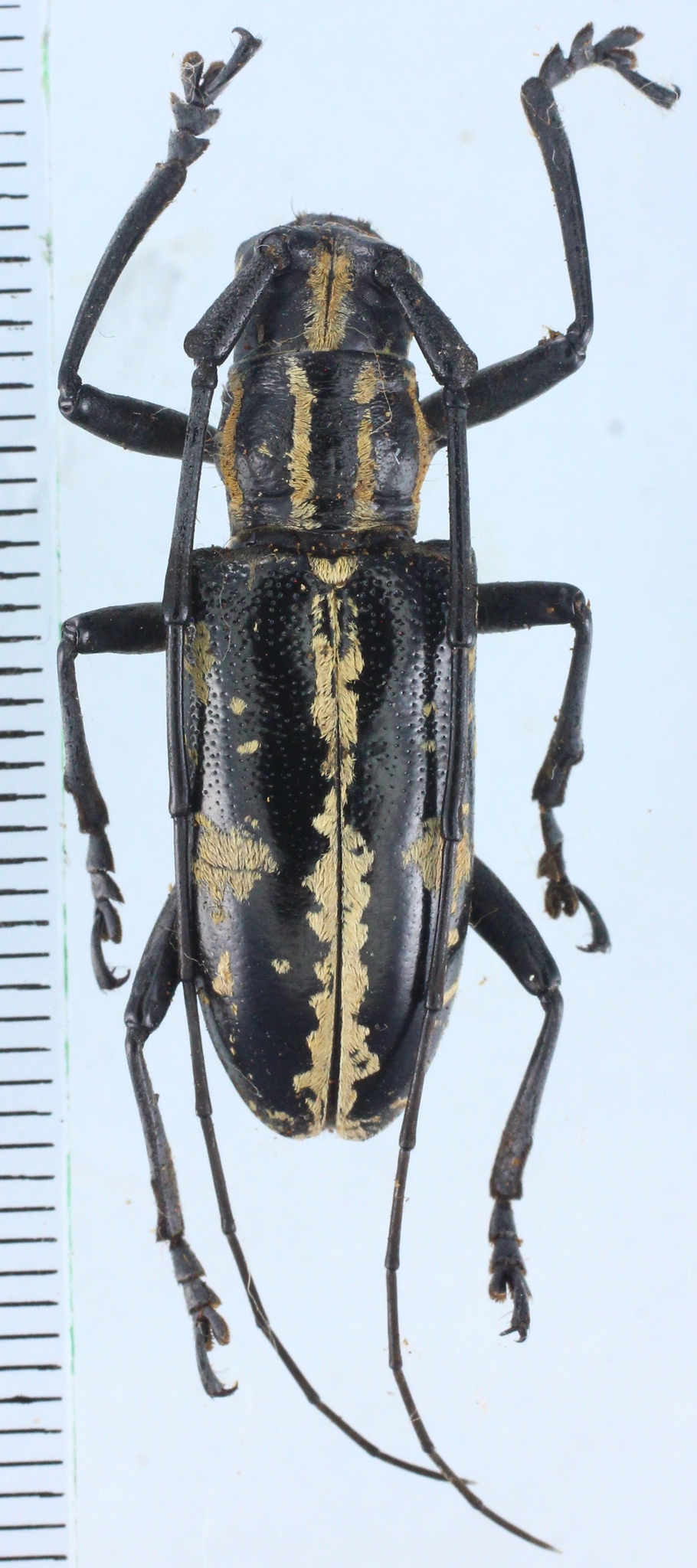

Scientific classification
- Kingdom: Animalia
- Phylum: Arthropoda
- Clade: Pancrustacea
- Class: Insecta
- Order: Coleoptera
- Suborder: Polyphaga
- Infraorder: Cucujiformia
- Family: Cerambycidae
- Genus: Epepeotes
- Species: E. nitidus

Binomial name
- Epepeotes nitidus (Aurivillius, 1923)

Synonyms
- Diochares nitidus Aurivillius, 1923

= Epepeotes nitidus =

Species of beetle

Epepeotes nitidus is a species of beetle in the family Cerambycidae. It was described by Per Olof Christopher Aurivillius in 1923, originally under the genus Diochares. It is known from Sulawesi.
