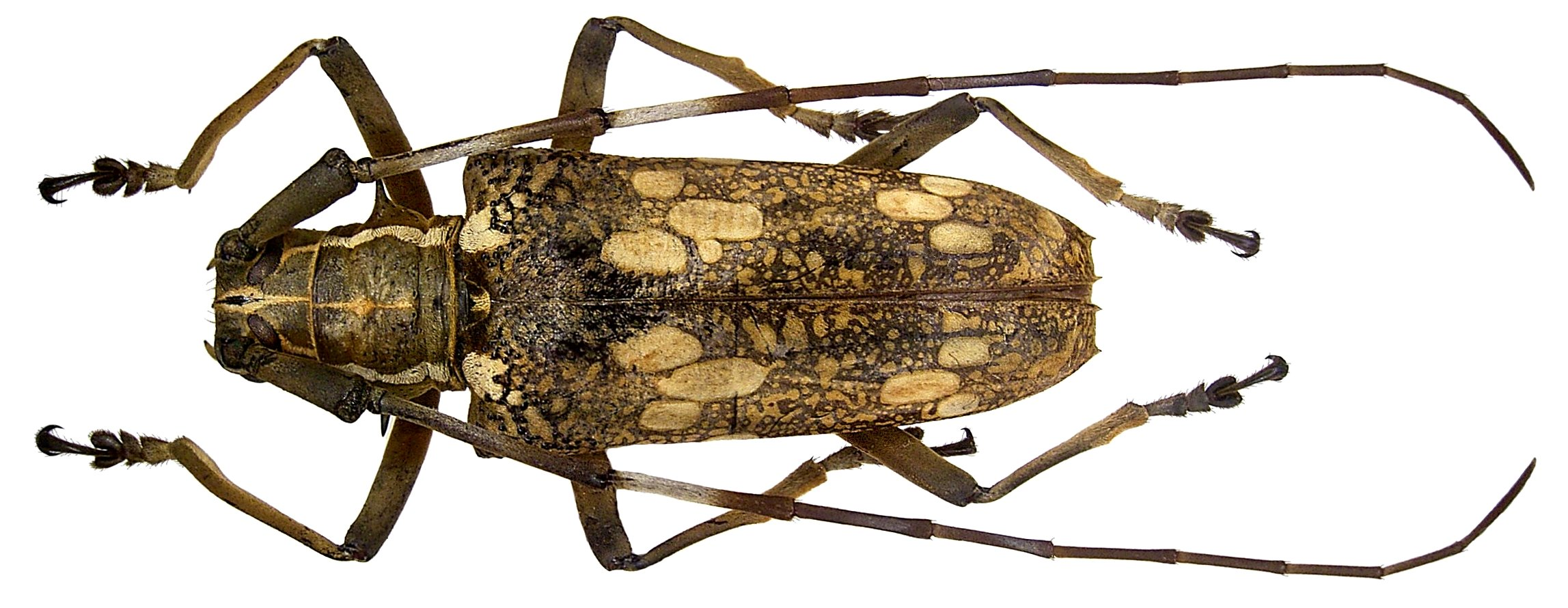

Scientific classification
- Domain: Eukaryota
- Kingdom: Animalia
- Phylum: Arthropoda
- Class: Insecta
- Order: Coleoptera
- Suborder: Polyphaga
- Infraorder: Cucujiformia
- Family: Cerambycidae
- Tribe: Lamiini
- Genus: Epepeotes
- Species: E. schlegelii

Binomial name
- Epepeotes schlegelii Lansberge, 1884

Synonyms
- Epepeotes diversemaculatus Schwarzer, 1927; Epepeotes schlegeli Lansberge, 1884 (misspelling)

= Epepeotes schlegelii =

Species of beetle

Epepeotes schlegelii is a species of beetle in the family Cerambycidae. It was described by Lansberge in 1884. It is known from Sumatra.
