= Epepeotes himalayanus =

Scientific classification
- Kingdom: Animalia
- Phylum: Arthropoda
- Class: Insecta
- Order: Coleoptera
- Suborder: Polyphaga
- Infraorder: Cucujiformia
- Family: Cerambycidae
- Genus: Epepeotes
- Species: E. himalayanus

Binomial name
- Epepeotes himalayanus Breuning, 1950

Species of beetle

Epepeotes himalayanus is a species of beetle in the family Cerambycidae. It was described by Stephan von Breuning in 1950.
