= Epepeotes nicobaricus =

Scientific classification
- Kingdom: Animalia
- Phylum: Arthropoda
- Class: Insecta
- Order: Coleoptera
- Suborder: Polyphaga
- Infraorder: Cucujiformia
- Family: Cerambycidae
- Genus: Epepeotes
- Species: E. nicobaricus

Binomial name
- Epepeotes nicobaricus Breuning, 1960

Species of beetle

Epepeotes nicobaricus is a species of beetle in the family Cerambycidae. It was described by Stephan von Breuning in 1960.
