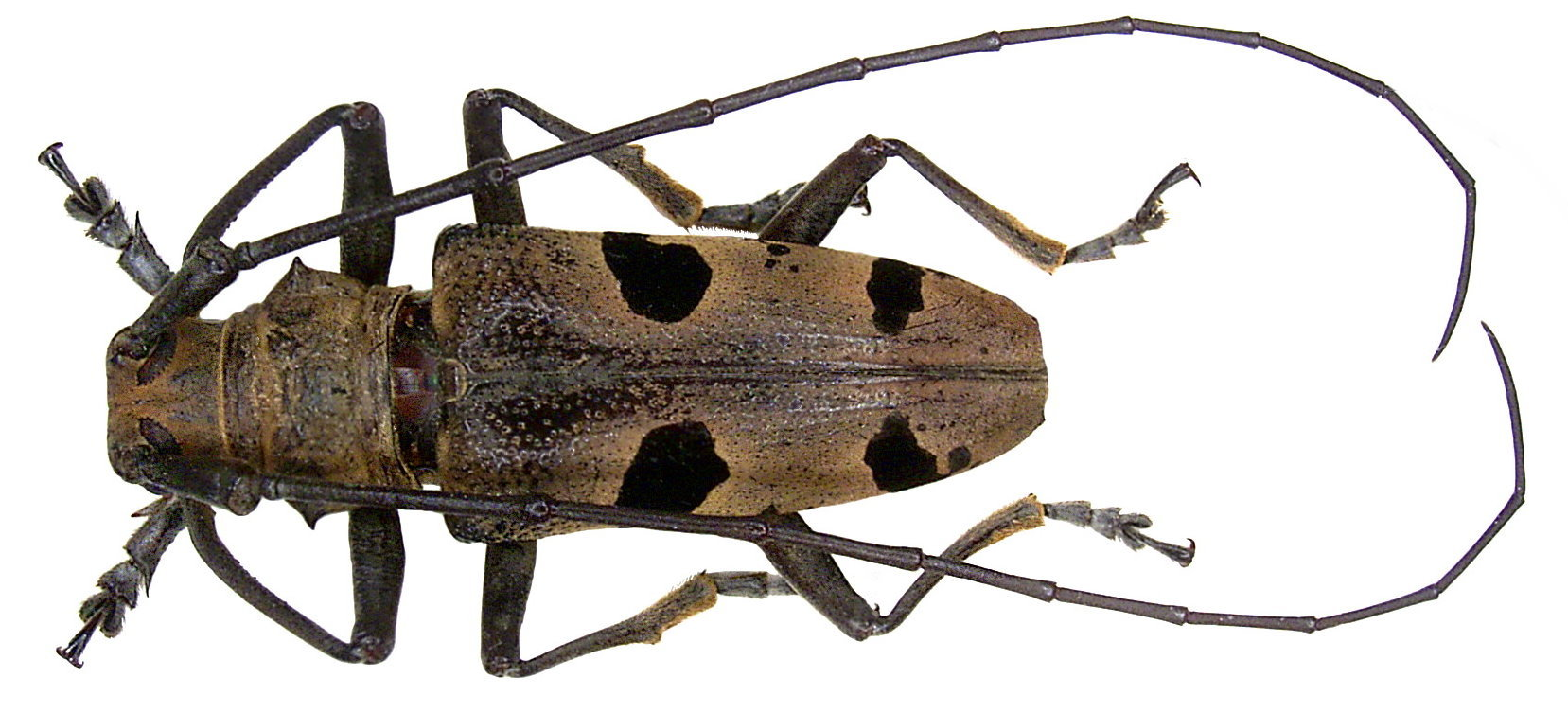

Scientific classification
- Kingdom: Animalia
- Phylum: Arthropoda
- Clade: Pancrustacea
- Class: Insecta
- Order: Coleoptera
- Suborder: Polyphaga
- Infraorder: Cucujiformia
- Family: Cerambycidae
- Genus: Epepeotes
- Species: E. plorator

Binomial name
- Epepeotes plorator (Newman, 1842)

Synonyms
- Epepeotes multinotatus Pic, 1925; Monohammus plorator Newman, 1842; Rhamses vitticollis Thomson, 1878

= Epepeotes plorator =

Species of beetle

Epepeotes plorator is a species of beetle in the family Cerambycidae. It was described by Newman in 1842. It is known from Sulawesi and the Philippines.

== Subspecies ==
- Epepeotes plorator celebensis Aurivillius, 1921
- Epepeotes plorator plorator (Newman, 1842)
- Epepeotes plorator sanghiricus Breuning, 1938
- Epepeotes plorator uniformis Breuning, 1943
