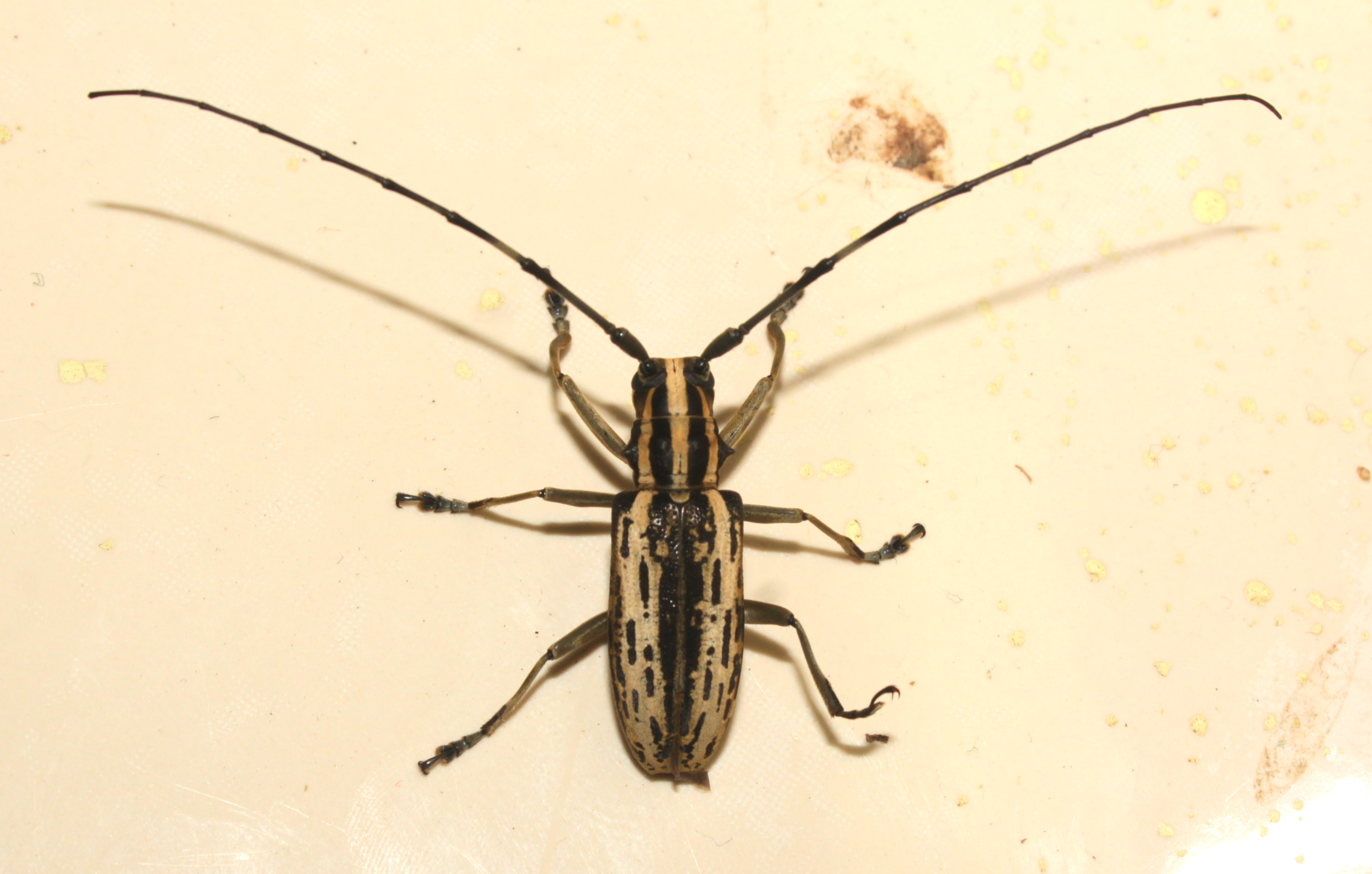

Scientific classification
- Domain: Eukaryota
- Kingdom: Animalia
- Phylum: Arthropoda
- Class: Insecta
- Order: Coleoptera
- Suborder: Polyphaga
- Infraorder: Cucujiformia
- Family: Cerambycidae
- Tribe: Lamiini
- Genus: Epepeotes
- Species: E. uncinatus

Binomial name
- Epepeotes uncinatus Gahan, 1888

Synonyms
- Epepeotes lineata Pic, 1944; Epepeotes uncinatus m. lineatopunctatus Breuning, 1960; Epepeotes uncinatus m. savazai Pic, 1925

= Epepeotes uncinatus =

Species of beetle

Epepeotes uncinatus is a species of beetle in the family Cerambycidae. It was described by Charles Joseph Gahan in 1888. It is known from China, Bhutan, Vietnam, Laos, India, and Myanmar. It feeds on Morus australis and three species of Ficus; F. carica F. elastica, and F. religiosa.
