= Curtomerus glaber =

Scientific classification
- Domain: Eukaryota
- Kingdom: Animalia
- Phylum: Arthropoda
- Class: Insecta
- Order: Coleoptera
- Suborder: Polyphaga
- Infraorder: Cucujiformia
- Family: Cerambycidae
- Subfamily: Cerambycinae
- Tribe: Callidiopini
- Genus: Curtomerus
- Species: C. glaber

Binomial name
- Curtomerus glaber (Fisher, 1932)

Synonyms
- Curtomerus glabrus (Fisher, 1932)

Species of beetle

Curtomerus glaber is a species in the longhorn beetle family Cerambycidae, found in Cuba.
