= Curtomerus lingafelteri =

Scientific classification
- Domain: Eukaryota
- Kingdom: Animalia
- Phylum: Arthropoda
- Class: Insecta
- Order: Coleoptera
- Suborder: Polyphaga
- Infraorder: Cucujiformia
- Family: Cerambycidae
- Subfamily: Cerambycinae
- Tribe: Callidiopini
- Genus: Curtomerus
- Species: C. lingafelteri

Binomial name
- Curtomerus lingafelteri Galileo & Martins, 2011

Species of beetle

Curtomerus lingafelteri is a species of Long-Horned Beetle in the beetle family Cerambycidae. It is found in Bolivia.
