= Curtomerus politus =

Scientific classification
- Domain: Eukaryota
- Kingdom: Animalia
- Phylum: Arthropoda
- Class: Insecta
- Order: Coleoptera
- Suborder: Polyphaga
- Infraorder: Cucujiformia
- Family: Cerambycidae
- Subfamily: Cerambycinae
- Tribe: Callidiopini
- Genus: Curtomerus
- Species: C. politus

Binomial name
- Curtomerus politus Martins, 1995

Species of beetle

Curtomerus politus is a species of Long-Horned Beetle in the beetle family Cerambycidae. It is found in Colombia.
