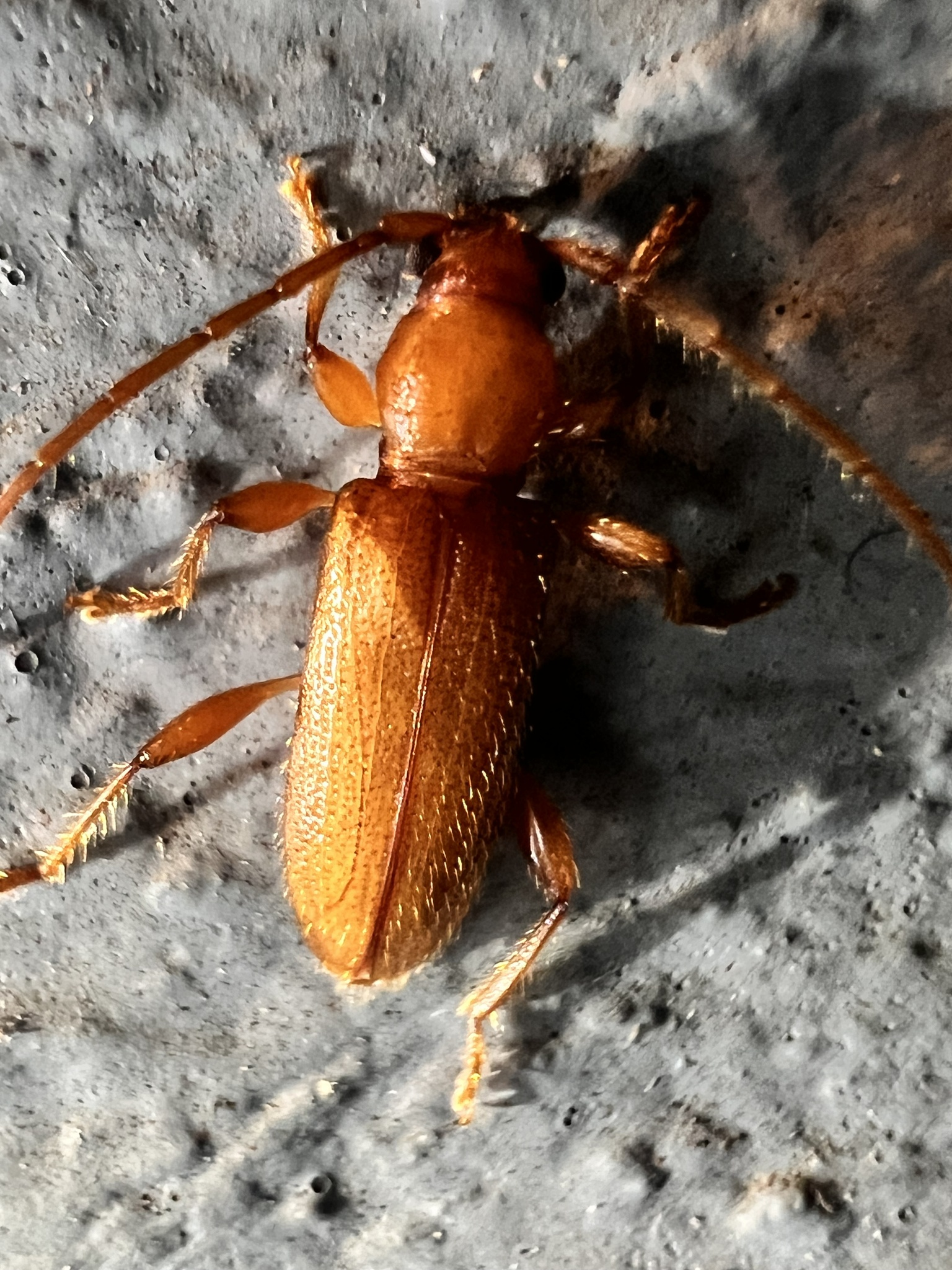
- Curtomerus flavus, Curtomerus long-horned beetle, Hawaii

Scientific classification
- Domain: Eukaryota
- Kingdom: Animalia
- Phylum: Arthropoda
- Class: Insecta
- Order: Coleoptera
- Suborder: Polyphaga
- Infraorder: Cucujiformia
- Family: Cerambycidae
- Subfamily: Cerambycinae
- Tribe: Callidiopini
- Genus: Curtomerus
- Species: C. flavus

Binomial name
- Curtomerus flavus (Fabricius, 1775)

Synonyms
- Callidium flavum Zimsen, 1964; Cerambyx flavus Gmelin, 1790; Ceresium impuncticolle Fairmaire, 1881; Curtomerus luteus Stephens, 1839; Curtomerus pallida (Newman, 1833); Curtomerus pilicorne (Fabricius, 1792); Curtomerus pilicornis Wollaston, 1877; Curtomerus setiger (Sharp, 1878); Curtomerus subflavus Lingafelter et al., 2014; Cylindera flava Wolcott, 1924

= Curtomerus flavus =

Species of beetle

Curtomerus flavus is a species in the longhorn beetle family Cerambycidae. It is found in North, Central, and South America, as well as Pacific and Caribbean islands.

This species was described by Johan Christian Fabricius in 1775.
