= Curtomerus brunneus =

Scientific classification
- Kingdom: Animalia
- Phylum: Arthropoda
- Class: Insecta
- Order: Coleoptera
- Suborder: Polyphaga
- Infraorder: Cucujiformia
- Family: Cerambycidae
- Subfamily: Cerambycinae
- Tribe: Callidiopini
- Genus: Curtomerus
- Species: C. brunneus

Binomial name
- Curtomerus brunneus (Kirsch, 1889)

Synonyms
- Oeme brunnea Kirsch, 1889

Species of beetle

Curtomerus brunneus is a species of Long-Horned Beetle in the beetle family Cerambycidae. It is found in Ecuador.

This species was described by Theodor Franz Wilhelm Kirsch in 1889.
