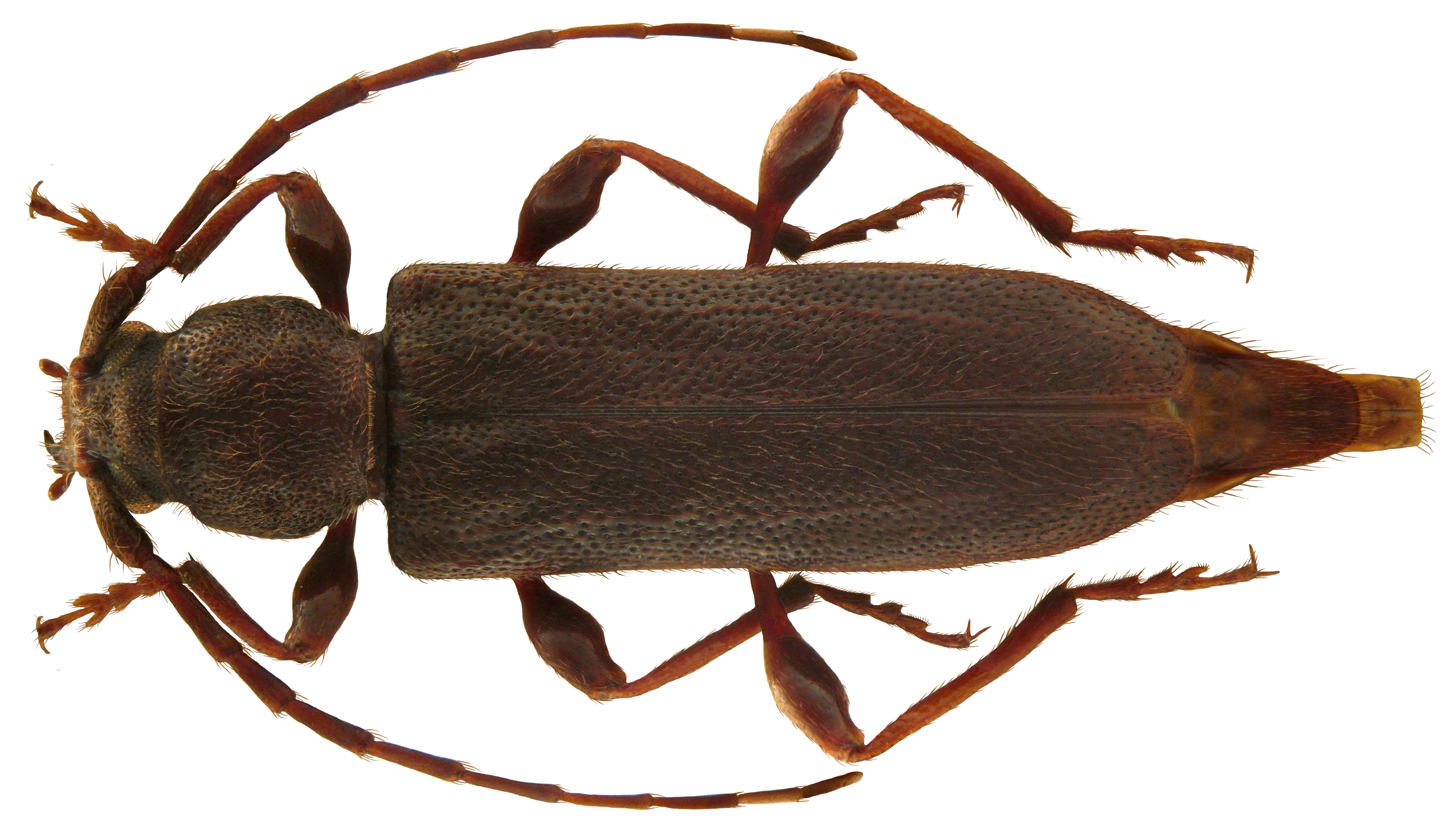
- Trinophylum cribratum

Scientific classification
- Domain: Eukaryota
- Kingdom: Animalia
- Phylum: Arthropoda
- Class: Insecta
- Order: Coleoptera
- Suborder: Polyphaga
- Infraorder: Cucujiformia
- Family: Cerambycidae
- Subfamily: Cerambycinae
- Tribe: Callidiopini
- Genus: Trinophylum; Bates, 1878

Synonyms
- Trinophyllum Stebbing, 1914 (misspelling)

= Trinophylum =

Genus of beetles

Trinophylum is a genus of longhorn beetles in the tribe Callidiopini, erected by Henry Walter Bates in 1878.

The type species Trinophylum cribratum, sometimes called the "deodar longicorn bast-eater" feeds on deodar trees (Cedrus deodara). It has been recorded from India and Pakistan but has also been accidentally introduced into southern England.

== Species ==
BioLib lists:

- Trinophylum cribratum Bates, 1878 - type species
- Trinophylum descarpentriesi Gressitt & Rondon, 1970 - Laos
