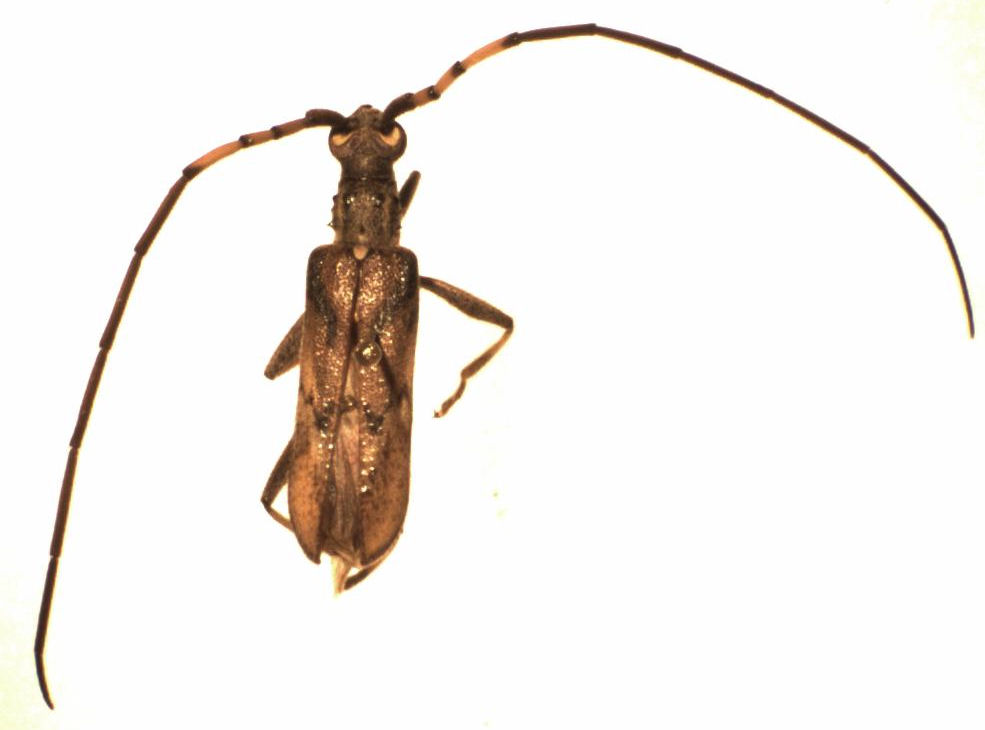
- Didymocantha obliqua

Scientific classification
- Domain: Eukaryota
- Kingdom: Animalia
- Phylum: Arthropoda
- Class: Insecta
- Order: Coleoptera
- Suborder: Polyphaga
- Infraorder: Cucujiformia
- Family: Cerambycidae
- Tribe: Callidiopini
- Genus: Didymocantha; Newman, 1840

Species
- See text

= Didymocantha =

Genus of beetle

Didymocantha is a genus of longhorn beetles.

== Species ==
The following species are accepted in the genus Didymocantha:

- Didymocantha brevicollis Pascoe, 1866
- Didymocantha clavipes Broun, 1883
- Didymocantha flavopicta McKeown, 1949
- Didymocantha gracilis McKeown, 1942
- Didymocantha laticornis (Fauvel, 1906)
- Didymocantha nigra Blackburn, 1890
- Didymocantha novica Blackburn, 1892
- Didymocantha obliqua Newman, 1840
- Didymocantha pallida Broun, 1893
- Didymocantha picta Bates, 1874
- Didymocantha quadriguttata Sharp, 1886
- Didymocantha sublineata (White, 1846)
