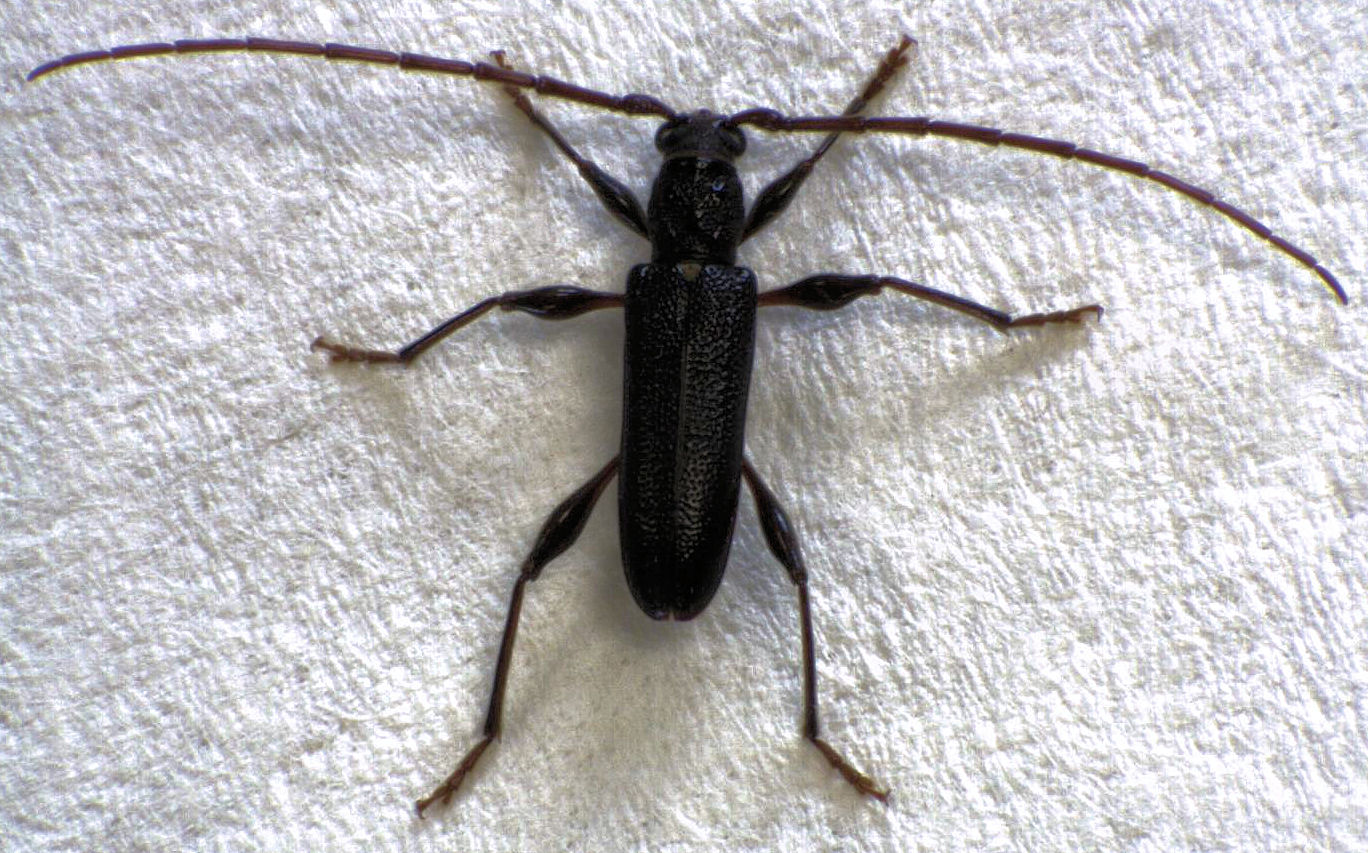
- Callidiopis scutellaris

Scientific classification
- Kingdom: Animalia
- Phylum: Arthropoda
- Class: Insecta
- Order: Coleoptera
- Suborder: Polyphaga
- Infraorder: Cucujiformia
- Family: Cerambycidae
- Tribe: Callidiopini
- Genus: Callidiopis; Thomson, 1864

Species
- Callidiopis mutica Lacordaire, 1869; Callidiopis praecox (Erichson, 1842); Callidiopis scutellaris (Fabricius, 1801)

= Callidiopis =

Genus of beetle

Callidiopis is a genus of longhorn beetle in the family Cerambycidae.
