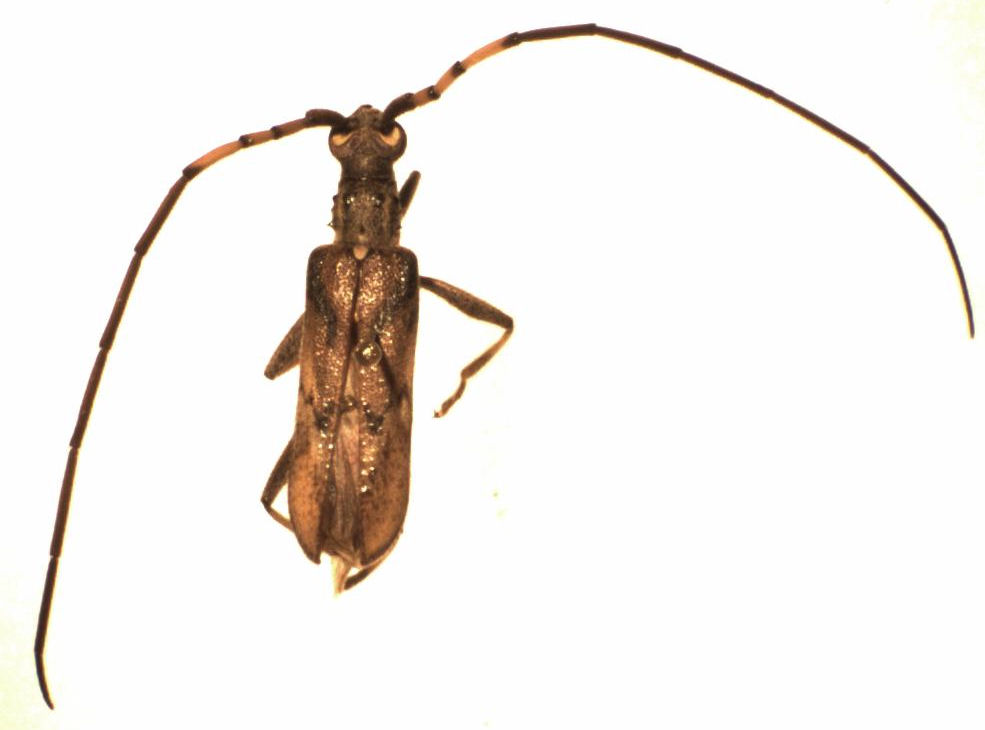

Scientific classification
- Domain: Eukaryota
- Kingdom: Animalia
- Phylum: Arthropoda
- Class: Insecta
- Order: Coleoptera
- Suborder: Polyphaga
- Infraorder: Cucujiformia
- Family: Cerambycidae
- Genus: Didymocantha
- Species: D. obliqua

Binomial name
- Didymocantha obliqua Newman, 1840

= Didymocantha obliqua =

Species of beetle

Didymocantha obliqua is a species of longhorn beetle native to Australia. It is an established exotic in New Zealand.
