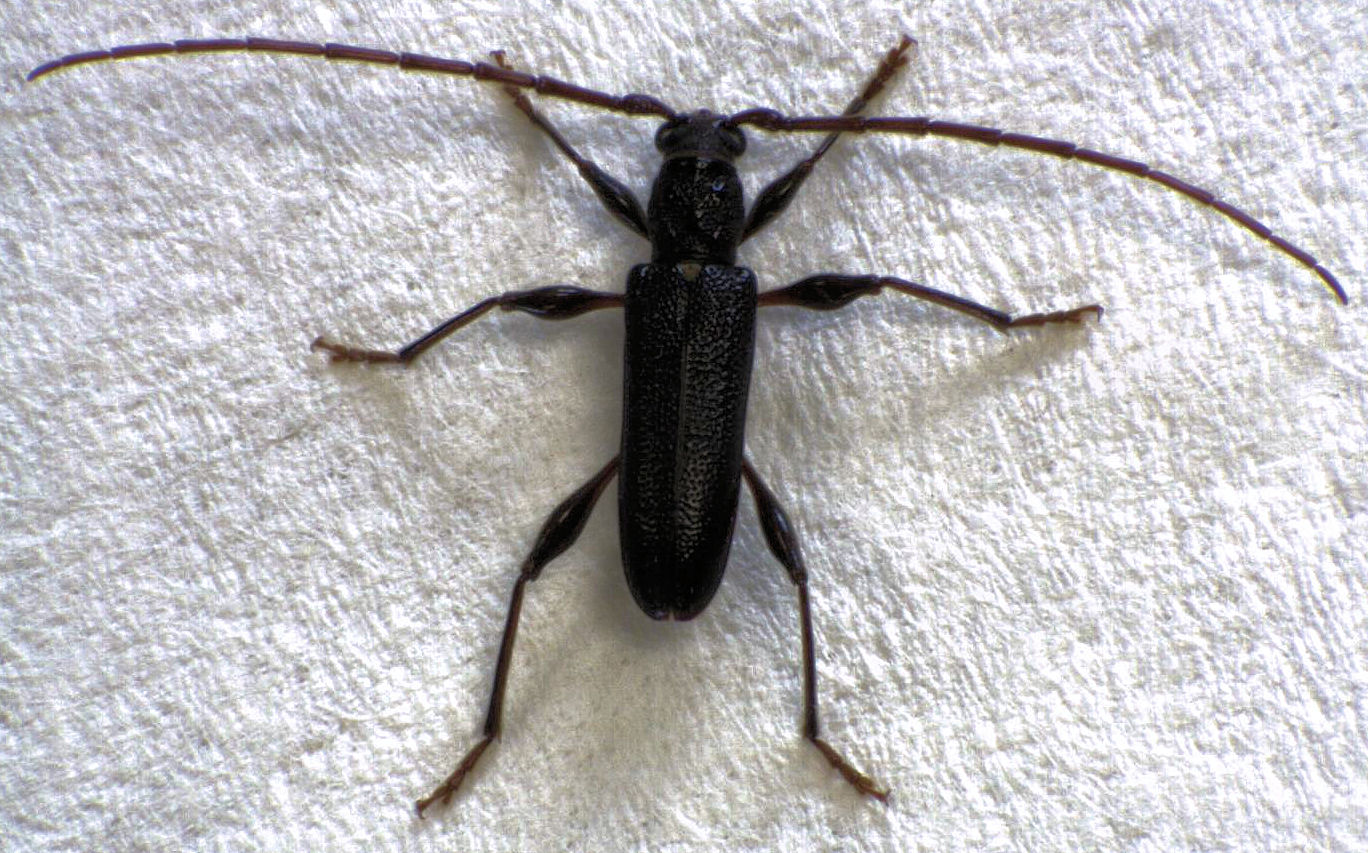

Scientific classification
- Kingdom: Animalia
- Phylum: Arthropoda
- Class: Insecta
- Order: Coleoptera
- Suborder: Polyphaga
- Infraorder: Cucujiformia
- Family: Cerambycidae
- Genus: Callidiopis
- Species: C. scutellaris

Binomial name
- Callidiopis scutellaris (Fabricius, 1801)

= Callidiopis scutellaris =

Species of beetle

Callidiopis scutellaris, the round-headed wood borer, is a native Australian beetle now also present in New Zealand.
