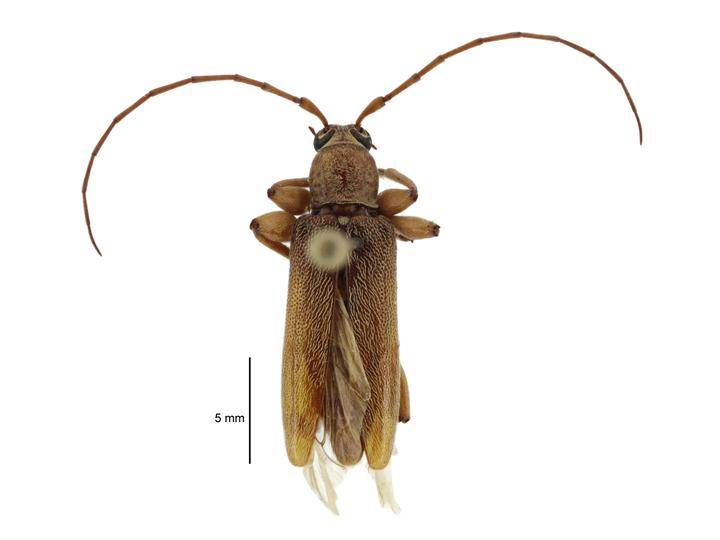
- Ceresium unicolor

Scientific classification
- Domain: Eukaryota
- Kingdom: Animalia
- Phylum: Arthropoda
- Class: Insecta
- Order: Coleoptera
- Suborder: Polyphaga
- Infraorder: Cucujiformia
- Family: Cerambycidae
- Subfamily: Cerambycinae
- Tribe: Callidiopini
- Genus: Ceresium; Newman, 1842

Species
- See text

= Ceresium =

Genus of beetle

Ceresium is a genus of beetles in the family Cerambycidae.

== Species ==
The following species and subspecies are accepted within Ceresium:

- Ceresium affinis (Gahan, 1900)
- Ceresium annulicornis (Germar, 1848)
- Ceresium binotatum
- Ceresium brevipes
- Ceresium casilelium
- Ceresium clarkei
- Ceresium compressipenne
- Ceresium coronarium
- Ceresium cribrum
- Ceresium cylindricellum
- Ceresium decorum
- Ceresium discicolle
- Ceresium diversum
- Ceresium epilais
- Ceresium flavicorne
- Ceresium flavipes (Fabricius, 1792)
- Ceresium furtivum
- Ceresium geniculatum
- Ceresium gracilipes
- Ceresium grandipenne
- Ceresium guamum
  - Ceresium guamum subsp. rotanum
- Ceresium guttaticolle
  - Ceresium guttaticolle subsp. yapense
- Ceresium humerale
- Ceresium inerme
- Ceresium kimberley Slipinski & Escalona, 2016
- Ceresium lanigera
- Ceresium lanuginosum
- Ceresium larvatum
- Ceresium leprosum
- Ceresium lieftincki
- Ceresium lineigerum Pascoe, 1888
- Ceresium lucidum
- Ceresium maculaticolle
- Ceresium minor (Blackburn, 1894)
- Ceresium miserum
- Ceresium mjoebergi Aurivillius, 1917
- Ceresium nakatae
- Ceresium nanyoanum
- Ceresium nigroapicale
- Ceresium nigrum Gahan, 1888
- Ceresium nitidicolle
- Ceresium obscurum
- Ceresium olidum
- Ceresium pachymerum (Pascoe, 1869)
- Ceresium planatum
- Ceresium promissum
- Ceresium pubescens
- Ceresium quadrimaculatum Gahan, 1900
- Ceresium rainwaterae
- Ceresium raripilum Newman, 1842
- Ceresium repandum
- Ceresium robustum
- Ceresium rouyeri
- Ceresium rufipes
- Ceresium saipanicum
- Ceresium scutellaris
- Ceresium seminigrum Aurivillius, 1917
- Ceresium signaticolle
- Ceresium simile
- Ceresium simplex (White, 1855)
- Ceresium striatipenne
- Ceresium sublucidum
- Ceresium sventivanyi
- Ceresium testaceum
- Ceresium thyra
- Ceresium tibiale
- Ceresium unicolor
  - Ceresium unicolor subsp. marshallum
- Ceresium usingeri
- Ceresium vacillans
- Ceresium vile (Newman, 1841)
- Ceresium virens
- Ceresium vitticolle
- Ceresium vulneratum
- Ceresium yoshinoi
