= Ceresium flavipes =

Scientific classification
- Kingdom: Animalia
- Phylum: Arthropoda
- Class: Insecta
- Order: Coleoptera
- Suborder: Polyphaga
- Infraorder: Cucujiformia
- Family: Cerambycidae
- Genus: Ceresium
- Species: C. flavipes

Binomial name
- Ceresium flavipes (Fabricius, 1792)

Species of beetle

Ceresium flavipes is a species of beetle in the family Cerambycidae.
