= Ceresium clarkei =

Scientific classification
- Kingdom: Animalia
- Phylum: Arthropoda
- Class: Insecta
- Order: Coleoptera
- Suborder: Polyphaga
- Infraorder: Cucujiformia
- Family: Cerambycidae
- Genus: Ceresium
- Species: C. clarkei

Binomial name
- Ceresium clarkei (Gressitt, 1956)

Species of beetle

Ceresium clarkei is a species of beetle in the family Cerambycidae, found in the Federated States of Micronesia.

The species was first collected on Hill 1010, southeast of Mt. Matante on the island of Kusaie–now known as Kosrae. The holotype male was collected by J. F. Gates Clarke on 13 April 1953 and was later preserved at the National Museum of Natural History. It was scientifically described in 1956 by Judson Linsley Gressitt, who named C. clarkei after Clarke.
