= Ceresium compressipenne =

Scientific classification
- Domain: Eukaryota
- Kingdom: Animalia
- Phylum: Arthropoda
- Class: Insecta
- Order: Coleoptera
- Suborder: Polyphaga
- Infraorder: Cucujiformia
- Family: Cerambycidae
- Genus: Ceresium
- Species: C. compressipenne

Binomial name
- Ceresium compressipenne (Fisher, 1932)

Species of beetle

Ceresium compressipenne is a species of beetle in the family Cerambycidae.
