= Ceresium miserum =

Scientific classification
- Domain: Eukaryota
- Kingdom: Animalia
- Phylum: Arthropoda
- Class: Insecta
- Order: Coleoptera
- Suborder: Polyphaga
- Infraorder: Cucujiformia
- Family: Cerambycidae
- Genus: Ceresium
- Species: C. miserum

Binomial name
- Ceresium miserum (Thomson, 1878)

Species of beetle

Ceresium miserum is a species of beetle in the family Cerambycidae.
