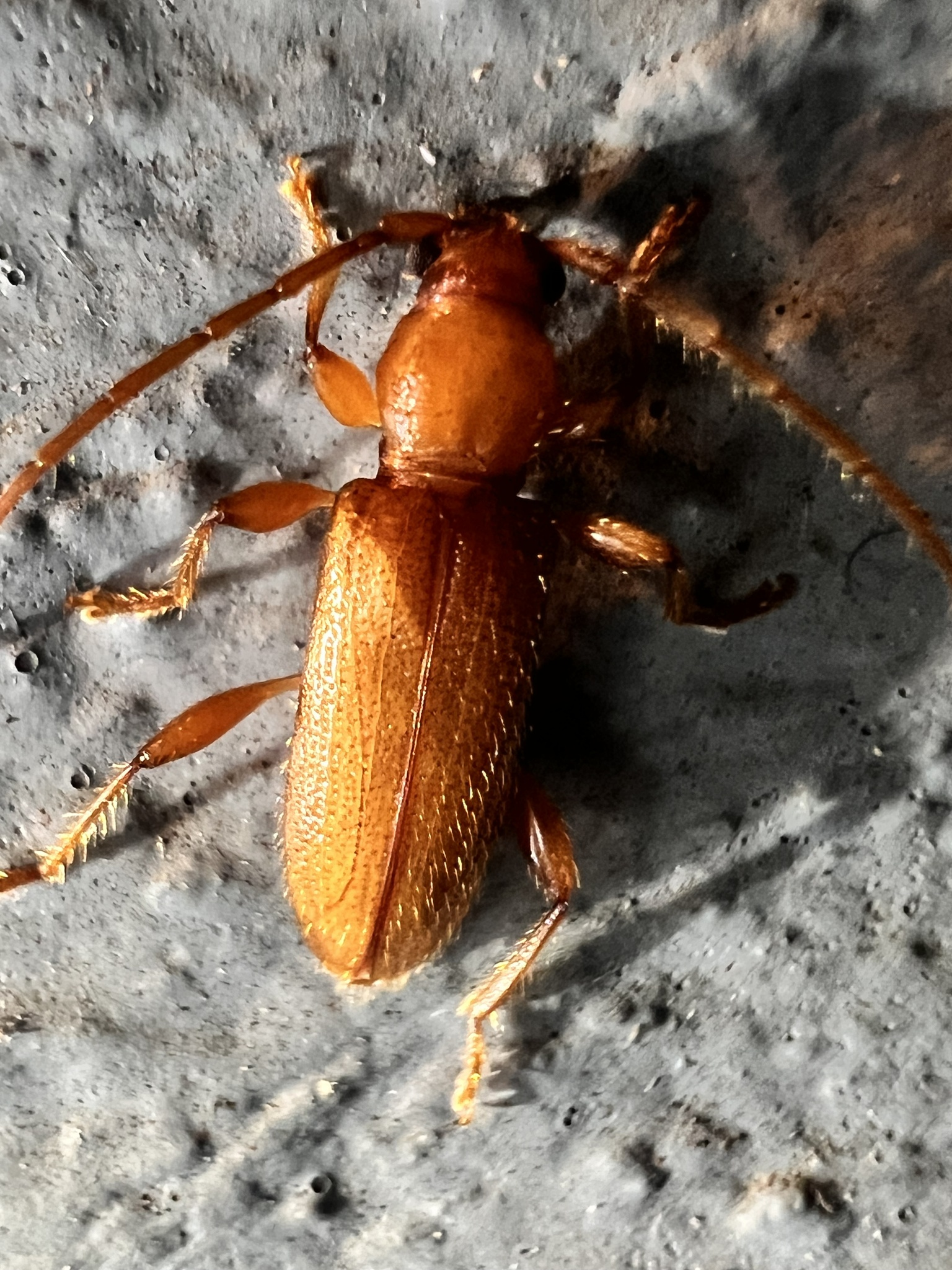
- Curtomerus flavus, Curtomerus long-horned beetle, Hawaii

Scientific classification
- Kingdom: Animalia
- Phylum: Arthropoda
- Class: Insecta
- Order: Coleoptera
- Suborder: Polyphaga
- Infraorder: Cucujiformia
- Family: Cerambycidae
- Subfamily: Cerambycinae
- Tribe: Callidiopini
- Genus: Curtomerus; Stephens, 1839

Synonyms
- Cylindera Newman, 1833; Cylindrodera Gemminger & Harold, 1872; Cyrtomerus Gemminger & Harold, 1872; Lampromerus Thomson, 1860; Sotenus Sharp, 1878

= Curtomerus =

Genus of beetles

Curtomerus is a genus in the longhorn beetle family Cerambycidae. There are about 9 described species in Curtomerus.

== Species ==
These species belong to the genus Curtomerus:

- Curtomerus brunneus (Kirsch, 1889) (Ecuador)
- Curtomerus fasciatus (Fisher, 1932) (Cuba and the United States)
- Curtomerus flavus (Fabricius, 1775) (North, Central, and South America, Pacific and Caribbean islands)
- Curtomerus glaber (Fisher, 1932)
- Curtomerus lingafelteri Galileo & Martins, 2011 (Bolivia)
- Curtomerus piraiuba Martins & Galileo, 2006 (Colombia)
- Curtomerus politus Martins, 1995 (Colombia)
- Curtomerus puncticollis (Fisher, 1932) (Haiti)
- Curtomerus purus Martins, 1974 (Bolivia)
