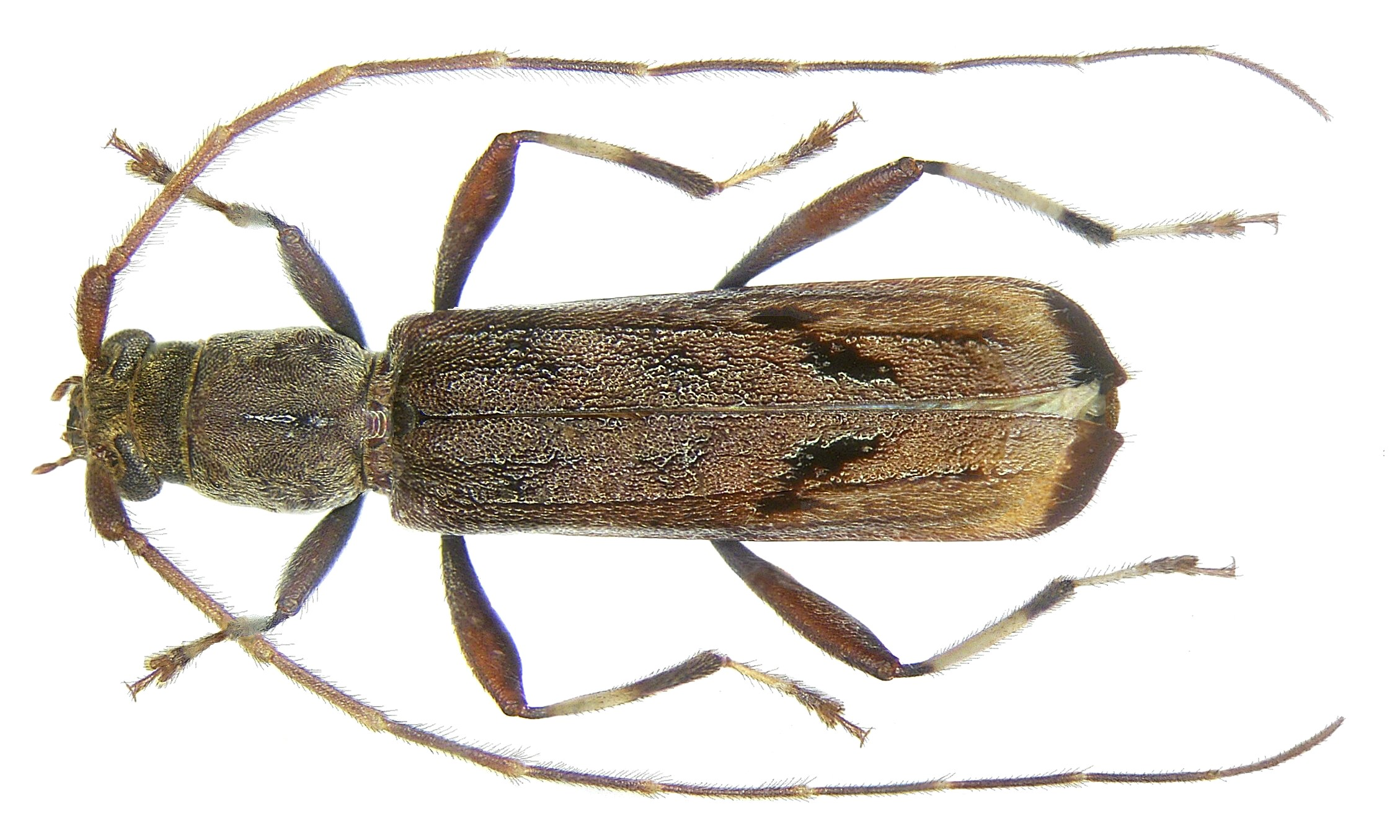
- Araespor callosus

Scientific classification
- Domain: Eukaryota
- Kingdom: Animalia
- Phylum: Arthropoda
- Class: Insecta
- Order: Coleoptera
- Suborder: Polyphaga
- Infraorder: Cucujiformia
- Family: Cerambycidae
- Subfamily: Cerambycinae
- Tribe: Callidiopini

Synonyms
- Callidiopsides Lacordaire, 1869; Callidiopsinae Pascoe, 1869; Callidiopsini Lacordaire, 1869 o; Neocorini Martins, 2005 (nomen nudum)

= Callidiopini =

Tribe of beetles

Callidiopini is a tribe of longhorn beetles in the subfamily Cerambycinae.

== Genera ==
These genera belong to the tribe Callidiopini:

1. Acuticeresium Villiers, 1970
2. Adrium Pascoe, 1866
3. Agnitosternum Jordan, 1894
4. Anthribatus Fairmaire, 1896
5. Asperidorsus Adlbauer, 2007
6. Becvarium Holzschuh, 2011
7. Bethelium Pascoe, 1866
8. Bornesalpinia Vives, 2010
9. Bouakea Adlbauer, 2003
10. Callidiopis Thomson, 1864
11. Ceresiella Holzschuh, 1995
12. Ceresium Newman, 1842
13. Cilium Fairmaire, 1898
14. Coccothorax Aurivillius, 1917
15. Conoxillus Adlbauer, 2002
16. Cristaphanes Vives, 2009
17. Curtomerus Stephens, 1839
18. Demelius Waterhouse, 1874
19. Diaspila Jordan, 1903
20. Didymocantha Newman, 1840
21. Eburida White, 1846
22. Ectinope Pascoe, 1875
23. Ectosticta Pascoe, 1866
24. Elegantozoum Adlbauer, 2004
25. Examnes Pascoe, 1869
26. Falsoibidion Pic, 1922
27. Ganosomus Fairmaire, 1901
28. Gelonaetha Thomson, 1878
29. Herozoum Thomson, 1878
30. Homaemota Pascoe, 1865
31. Hovorkaiana Adlbauer, 2019
32. Ipomoria Pascoe, 1866
33. Linyra Fairmaire, 1898
34. Metacopa Fairmaire, 1896
35. Minutius Fairmaire, 1896
36. Monoplia Newman, 1845
37. Nastocerus Fairmaire, 1897
38. Neobethelium Blackburn, 1894
39. Nesoptychias Kirkaldy, 1910
40. Notoceresium Blackburn, 1901
41. Oemona Newman, 1840
42. Oxymagis Pascoe, 1866
43. Paphora Pascoe, 1866
44. Parasalpinia Hayashi, 1962
45. Porithodes Aurivillius, 1912
46. Prosype Thomson, 1864
47. Pseudodemonax Vives & Heffern, 2012
48. Psylacrida Thomson, 1878
49. Salpinia Pascoe, 1869
50. Sassandrioides Adlbauer, 2008
51. Semiope Pascoe, 1869
52. Stenobrium Kolbe, 1893
53. Stenodryas Bates, 1873
54. Stenygrinum Bates, 1873
55. Sternangustum Jordan, 1894
56. Sudreia Vives & Mille, 2015
57. Teladum Holzschuh, 2011
58. Teocchius Adlbauer & Sudre, 2003
59. Tethionea Pascoe, 1869
60. Thephantes Pascoe, 1867
61. Trimeroderus Fairmaire, 1896
62. Trinophylum Bates, 1878
63. Vientiana Holzschuh, 2016
64. Wanatidius Vives & Sudre, 2019
65. Yorkeica Blackburn, 1899
66. Zarina Fairmaire, 1898
