= Mispila rufula =

Scientific classification
- Domain: Eukaryota
- Kingdom: Animalia
- Phylum: Arthropoda
- Class: Insecta
- Order: Coleoptera
- Suborder: Polyphaga
- Infraorder: Cucujiformia
- Family: Cerambycidae
- Genus: Mispila
- Subgenus: Mispila (Dryusa)
- Species: M. rufula

Binomial name
- Mispila rufula Pascoe, 1864

Species of beetle

Mispila rufula is a species of beetle in the family Cerambycidae. It was described by Francis Polkinghorne Pascoe in 1864.
