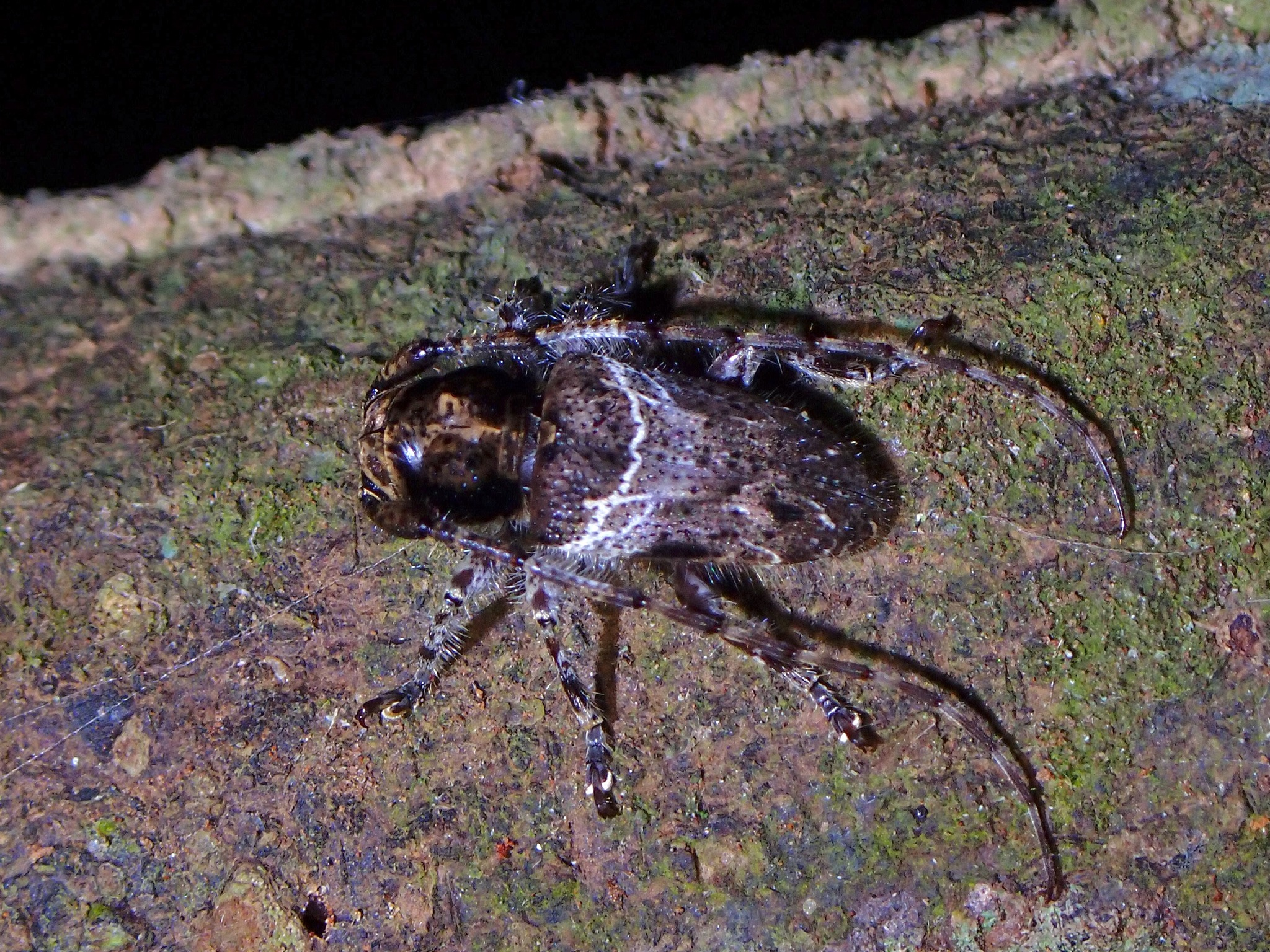

Scientific classification
- Kingdom: Animalia
- Phylum: Arthropoda
- Clade: Pancrustacea
- Class: Insecta
- Order: Coleoptera
- Suborder: Polyphaga
- Infraorder: Cucujiformia
- Family: Cerambycidae
- Genus: Mispila
- Subgenus: Mispila (Mispila)
- Species: M. venosa

Binomial name
- Mispila venosa Pascoe, 1864

Synonyms
- Mispila augaralis Pascoe, 1878; Sodus tenuevittata Pic, 1930

= Mispila venosa =

Species of beetle

Mispila venosa is a species of beetle in the family Cerambycidae. It was described by Francis Polkinghorne Pascoe in 1864. It is known from Malaysia, Indonesia (Sulawesi, Borneo, Java), Vietnam, and the Andaman Islands.
