= Mispila albopunctulata =

Scientific classification
- Domain: Eukaryota
- Kingdom: Animalia
- Phylum: Arthropoda
- Class: Insecta
- Order: Coleoptera
- Suborder: Polyphaga
- Infraorder: Cucujiformia
- Family: Cerambycidae
- Genus: Mispila
- Subgenus: Mispila (Mispila)
- Species: M. albopunctulata

Binomial name
- Mispila albopunctulata Heller, 1923

Synonyms
- Mispila mindanaonis Breuning, 1980

Species of beetle

Mispila albopunctulata is a species of beetle in the family Cerambycidae. It was described by Heller in 1923.
