= Mispila tonkinea =

Scientific classification
- Kingdom: Animalia
- Phylum: Arthropoda
- Class: Insecta
- Order: Coleoptera
- Suborder: Polyphaga
- Infraorder: Cucujiformia
- Family: Cerambycidae
- Genus: Mispila
- Subgenus: Mispila (Mispila)
- Species: M. tonkinea

Binomial name
- Mispila tonkinea Pic, 1925

Synonyms
- Alidus tonkineus Pic, 1925; Mispila punctifrons Breuning, 1938

Species of beetle

Mispila tonkinea is a species of beetle in the family Cerambycidae. It was described by Maurice Pic in 1925, originally under the genus Alidus.<
