= Mispila obscura =

Scientific classification
- Domain: Eukaryota
- Kingdom: Animalia
- Phylum: Arthropoda
- Class: Insecta
- Order: Coleoptera
- Suborder: Polyphaga
- Infraorder: Cucujiformia
- Family: Cerambycidae
- Genus: Mispila
- Subgenus: Mispila (Mispila)
- Species: M. obscura

Binomial name
- Mispila obscura Gahan, 1890

Synonyms
- Alidus madurensis Pic, 1925

Species of beetle

Mispila obscura is a species of beetle in the family Cerambycidae. It was described by Charles Joseph Gahan in 1890.
