= Mispila tenuevittata =

Scientific classification
- Kingdom: Animalia
- Phylum: Arthropoda
- Class: Insecta
- Order: Coleoptera
- Suborder: Polyphaga
- Infraorder: Cucujiformia
- Family: Cerambycidae
- Genus: Mispila
- Subgenus: Mispila (Mispila)
- Species: M. tenuevittata

Binomial name
- Mispila tenuevittata (Pic, 1930)

Synonyms
- Sodus tenuevittatus Pic, 1930; Mispila assamensis Breuning, 1938; Mispila sonthianae Breuning, 1963

Species of beetle

Mispila tenuevittata is a species of beetle in the family Cerambycidae, native to south-east Asia where it has been found in southern China, north-eastern India, Thailand, Laos, and Vietnam.
