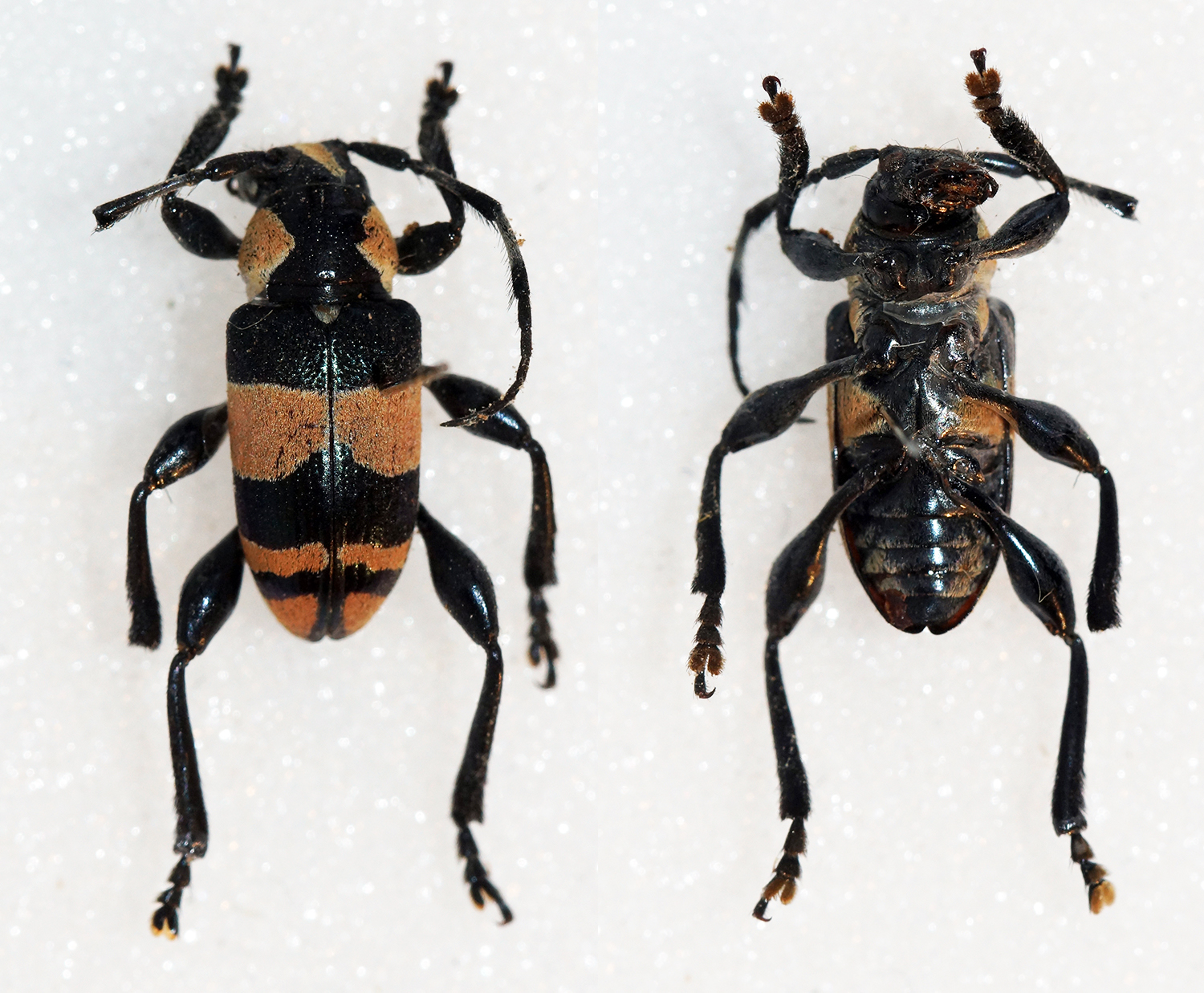

Scientific classification
- Kingdom: Animalia
- Phylum: Arthropoda
- Class: Insecta
- Order: Coleoptera
- Suborder: Polyphaga
- Infraorder: Cucujiformia
- Family: Cerambycidae
- Genus: Pseudodoliops
- Species: P. elegans

Binomial name
- Pseudodoliops elegans (Heller, 1916)

Synonyms
- Diatylus elegans Heller, 1916

= Pseudodoliops elegans =

Species of beetle

Pseudodoliops elegans is a species of beetle in the family Cerambycidae. It was described by Heller in 1916, originally under the genus Diatylus.
