= Mispila sibuyana =

Scientific classification
- Kingdom: Animalia
- Phylum: Arthropoda
- Class: Insecta
- Order: Coleoptera
- Suborder: Polyphaga
- Infraorder: Cucujiformia
- Family: Cerambycidae
- Genus: Mispila
- Subgenus: Mispila (Mispila)
- Species: M. sibuyana

Binomial name
- Mispila sibuyana Breuning, 1939

Species of beetle

Mispila sibuyana is a species of beetle in the family Cerambycidae. It was described by Stephan von Breuning in 1939.
