= Mispila plagiata =

Scientific classification
- Kingdom: Animalia
- Phylum: Arthropoda
- Class: Insecta
- Order: Coleoptera
- Suborder: Polyphaga
- Infraorder: Cucujiformia
- Family: Cerambycidae
- Genus: Mispila
- Subgenus: Mispila (Mispila)
- Species: M. plagiata

Binomial name
- Mispila plagiata Pic, 1934

Synonyms
- Alidus plagiatus Pic, 1934

Species of beetle

Mispila plagiata is a species of beetle in the family Cerambycidae. It was described by Maurice Pic in 1934.
