= Mispila dotata =

Scientific classification
- Kingdom: Animalia
- Phylum: Arthropoda
- Class: Insecta
- Order: Coleoptera
- Suborder: Polyphaga
- Infraorder: Cucujiformia
- Family: Cerambycidae
- Genus: Mispila
- Subgenus: Mispila (Dryusa)
- Species: M. dotata

Binomial name
- Mispila dotata Pascoe, 1864

Synonyms
- Dryusa dotata (Pascoe, 1864)

Species of beetle

Mispila dotata is a species of beetle in the family Cerambycidae. It was described by Francis Polkinghorne Pascoe in 1864. It is known from Moluccas.
