= Mispila zonaria =

Scientific classification
- Domain: Eukaryota
- Kingdom: Animalia
- Phylum: Arthropoda
- Class: Insecta
- Order: Coleoptera
- Suborder: Polyphaga
- Infraorder: Cucujiformia
- Family: Cerambycidae
- Genus: Mispila
- Subgenus: Mispila (Mispila)
- Species: M. zonaria

Binomial name
- Mispila zonaria Lacordaire, 1872

Synonyms
- Diatylus zonarius Lacordaire, 1872

Species of beetle

Mispila zonaria is a species of beetle in the family Cerambycidae. It was described by Lacordaire in 1872.
