= Mispila nicobarica =

Scientific classification
- Kingdom: Animalia
- Phylum: Arthropoda
- Class: Insecta
- Order: Coleoptera
- Suborder: Polyphaga
- Infraorder: Cucujiformia
- Family: Cerambycidae
- Genus: Mispila
- Subgenus: Mispila (Mispila)
- Species: M. nicobarica

Binomial name
- Mispila nicobarica Breuning, 1960

Species of beetle

Mispila nicobarica is a species of beetle in the family Cerambycidae. It was described by Stephan von Breuning in 1960.
