= Mispila pedongensis =

Scientific classification
- Kingdom: Animalia
- Phylum: Arthropoda
- Class: Insecta
- Order: Coleoptera
- Suborder: Polyphaga
- Infraorder: Cucujiformia
- Family: Cerambycidae
- Genus: Mispila
- Subgenus: Mispila (Trichomispila)
- Species: M. pedongensis

Binomial name
- Mispila pedongensis Breuning, 1969

Species of beetle

Mispila pedongensis is a species of beetle in the genus Cerambycidae. It was described by Stephan von Breuning in 1969.
