= Mispila philippinica =

Scientific classification
- Kingdom: Animalia
- Phylum: Arthropoda
- Clade: Pancrustacea
- Class: Insecta
- Order: Coleoptera
- Suborder: Polyphaga
- Infraorder: Cucujiformia
- Family: Cerambycidae
- Genus: Mispila
- Subgenus: Mispila (Mispila)
- Species: M. philippinica

Binomial name
- Mispila philippinica Heller, 1924

Species of beetle

Mispila philippinica is a species of long horn beetle in the family Cerambycidae. It was described by Heller in 1924. There is one sub-species Mesophalera philippinica philippinica identified by Schintlmeister in 1993.
