= Mispila minor =

Scientific classification
- Kingdom: Animalia
- Phylum: Arthropoda
- Class: Insecta
- Order: Coleoptera
- Suborder: Polyphaga
- Infraorder: Cucujiformia
- Family: Cerambycidae
- Genus: Mispila
- Subgenus: Mispila (Mispila)
- Species: M. minor

Binomial name
- Mispila minor Pic, 1926

Synonyms
- Alidus minor Pic, 1926

Species of beetle

Mispila minor is a species of beetle in the family Cerambycidae. It was described by Maurice Pic in 1926.
