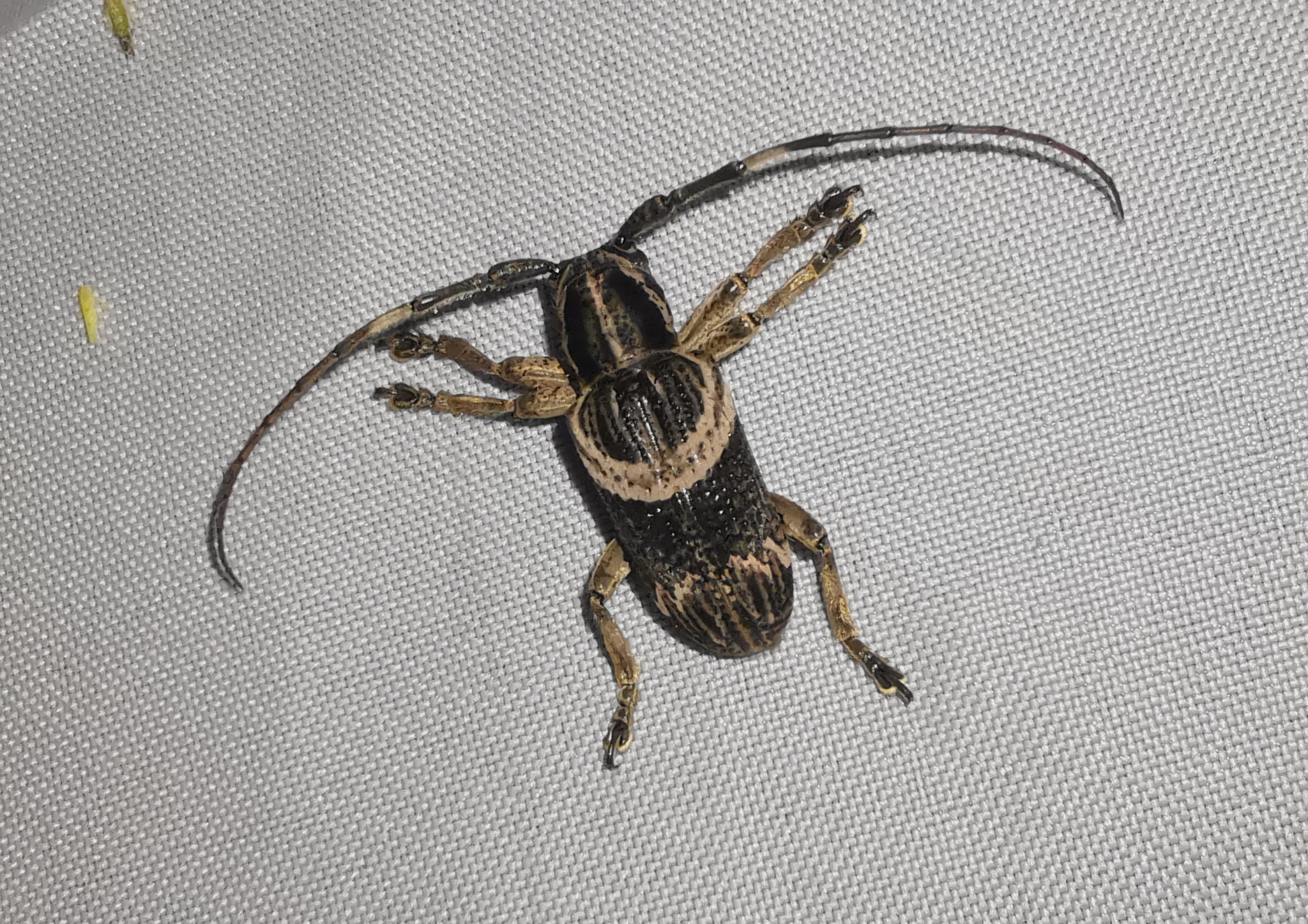

Scientific classification
- Domain: Eukaryota
- Kingdom: Animalia
- Phylum: Arthropoda
- Class: Insecta
- Order: Coleoptera
- Suborder: Polyphaga
- Infraorder: Cucujiformia
- Family: Cerambycidae
- Genus: Mispila
- Subgenus: Mispila (Mispila)
- Species: M. curvilinea

Binomial name
- Mispila curvilinea Pascoe, 1869

Synonyms
- Alidus multilineatus Pic, 1925

= Mispila curvilinea =

Species of beetle

Mispila curvilinea is a species of beetle in the family Cerambycidae. It was first described by Francis Polkinghorne Pascoe in 1869. It is known from Laos, Cambodia, India, and China.
