= Mispila apicalis =

Scientific classification
- Kingdom: Animalia
- Phylum: Arthropoda
- Class: Insecta
- Order: Coleoptera
- Suborder: Polyphaga
- Infraorder: Cucujiformia
- Family: Cerambycidae
- Genus: Mispila
- Subgenus: Mispila (Mispila)
- Species: M. apicalis

Binomial name
- Mispila apicalis Heller, 1923

Synonyms
- Mispila transversefasciata Breuning, 1950

Species of beetle

Mispila apicalis is a species of beetle in the family Cerambycidae. It was described by Heller in 1923. It is known from Borneo.
