= Mispila curvifascia =

Scientific classification
- Kingdom: Animalia
- Phylum: Arthropoda
- Class: Insecta
- Order: Coleoptera
- Suborder: Polyphaga
- Infraorder: Cucujiformia
- Family: Cerambycidae
- Genus: Mispila
- Subgenus: Mispila (Mispila)
- Species: M. curvifascia

Binomial name
- Mispila curvifascia Breuning, 1938

Species of beetle

Mispila curvifascia is a species of beetle in the family Cerambycidae. It was described by Stephan von Breuning in 1938.
