= Pseudodoliops rufipes =

Scientific classification
- Kingdom: Animalia
- Phylum: Arthropoda
- Class: Insecta
- Order: Coleoptera
- Suborder: Polyphaga
- Infraorder: Cucujiformia
- Family: Cerambycidae
- Genus: Pseudodoliops
- Species: P. rufipes

Binomial name
- Pseudodoliops rufipes Aurivillius, 1927

Synonyms
- Doliops rufipes

Species of beetle

Pseudodoliops rufipes is a species of beetle in the family Cerambycidae. It was described by Per Olof Christopher Aurivillius in 1927.
