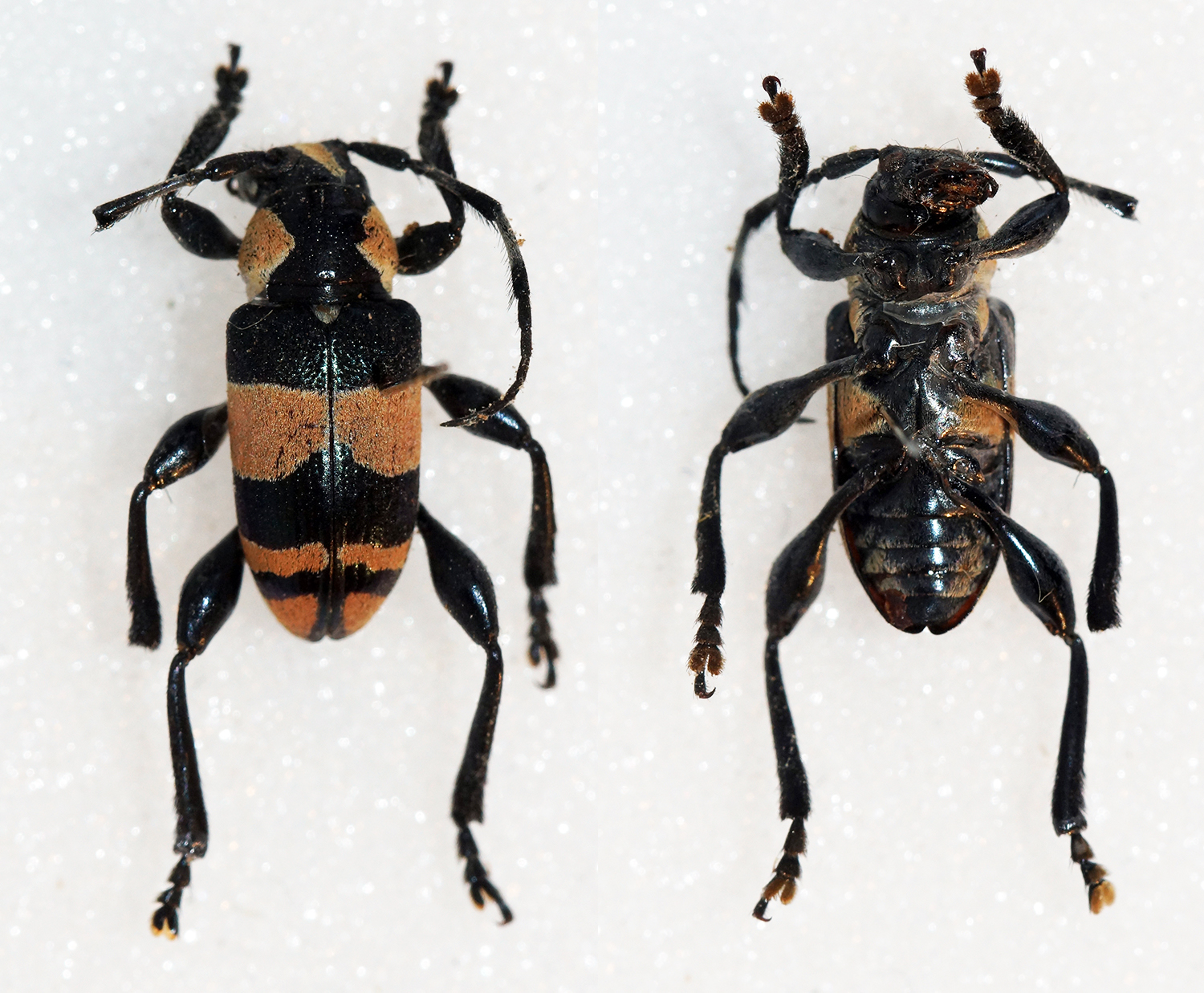
- Sex: Male, Size: 10mm

Scientific classification
- Kingdom: Animalia
- Phylum: Arthropoda
- Class: Insecta
- Order: Coleoptera
- Suborder: Polyphaga
- Infraorder: Cucujiformia
- Family: Cerambycidae
- Tribe: Apomecynini
- Genus: Pseudodoliops; Schultze, 1934

Synonyms
- Hemidoliops Vives 2012

= Pseudodoliops =

Genus of beetles

Pseudodoliops is a genus of longhorn beetles of the subfamily Lamiinae, containing the following species:

- Pseudodoliops bicolor (Vives, 2012)
- Pseudodoliops cagayanus (Vives, 2012)
- Pseudodoliops ditumaboensis Barševskis, 2018
- Pseudodoliops elegans (Heller, 1916)
- Pseudodoliops griseus Breuning, 1938
- Pseudodoliops ilocanus Vives, 2011
- Pseudodoliops rufipes (Aurivillius, 1927)
- Pseudodoliops weigeli Vives, 2015
