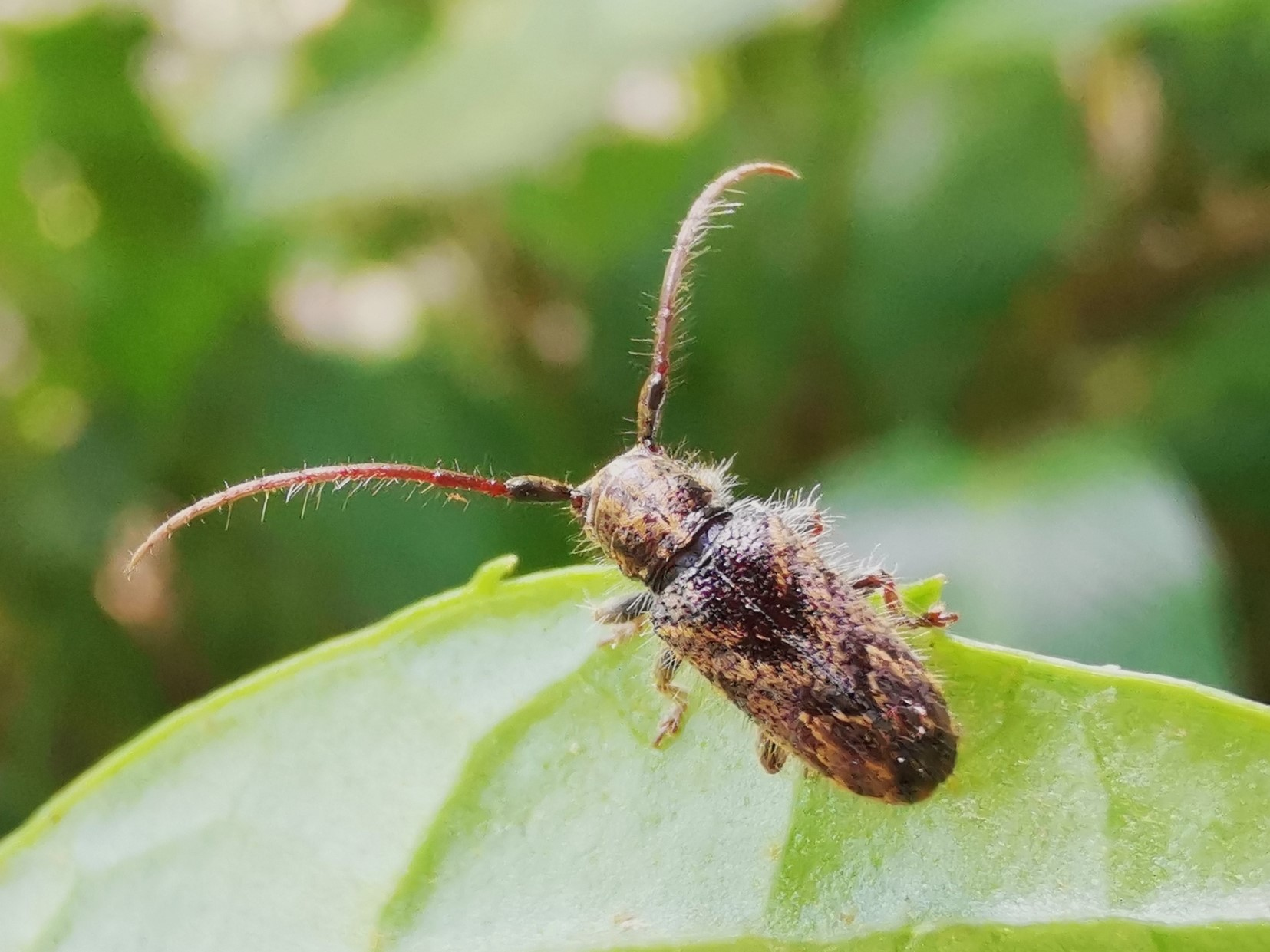
- Mispila taoi

Scientific classification
- Domain: Eukaryota
- Kingdom: Animalia
- Phylum: Arthropoda
- Class: Insecta
- Order: Coleoptera
- Suborder: Polyphaga
- Infraorder: Cucujiformia
- Family: Cerambycidae
- Subfamily: Lamiinae
- Genus: Mispila; Pascoe, 1864

Synonyms
- Diatylus Lacordaire, 1872

= Mispila =

Genus of beetles

Mispila is a genus of longhorn beetles of the subfamily Lamiinae, with three subgenera - Dryusa, Mispila, and Trichomispila. It contains the following species:

subgenus Dryusa

- Mispila diluta Pascoe, 1864
- Mispila dotata Pascoe, 1864
- Mispila flexuosa Pascoe, 1864
- Mispila rufula Pascoe, 1864

subgenus Mispila

- Mispila albopunctulata Heller, 1923
- Mispila albosignata Breuning, 1940
- Mispila annulicornis Pic, 1944
- Mispila apicalis Heller, 1923
- Mispila biarcuata Breuning, 1939
- Mispila celebensis Breuning, 1950
- Mispila coomani Pic, 1934
- Mispila curvifascia Breuning, 1938
- Mispila curvilinea Pascoe, 1869
- Mispila elongata Breuning, 1938
- Mispila flavopunctata Breuning, 1950
- Mispila impuncticollis Breuning, 1966
- Mispila javanica Breuning, 1938
- Mispila khamvengae Breuning, 1963
- Mispila minor Pic, 1926
- Mispila nicobarica Breuning, 1960
- Mispila nigrovittata Breuning, 1963
- Mispila notaticeps Pic, 1925
- Mispila obliquevittata Breuning, 1940
- Mispila obscura Gahan, 1890
- Mispila papuana Breuning, 1940
- Mispila papuensis Breuning, 1963
- Mispila parallela Breuning, 1937
- Mispila philippinica Heller, 1924
- Mispila plagiata Pic, 1934
- Mispila samarensis Breuning, 1939
- Mispila sibuyana Breuning, 1939
- Mispila siporensis Breuning, 1939
- Mispila subtonkinea Breuning, 1968
- Mispila taoi Breuning, 1963
- Mispila tenuevittata (Pic, 1930)
- Mispila tholana Gressit, 1940
- Mispila tonkinea Pic, 1925
- Mispila tonkinensis Breuning, 1964
- Mispila venosa Pascoe, 1864
- Mispila zonaria Lacordaire, 1872

subgenus Trichomispila

- Mispila pedongensis Breuning, 1969
- Mispila picta Breuning, 1939
