= Mispila (Trichomispila) =

Scientific classification
- Kingdom: Animalia
- Phylum: Arthropoda
- Class: Insecta
- Order: Coleoptera
- Suborder: Polyphaga
- Infraorder: Cucujiformia
- Family: Cerambycidae
- Genus: Mispila
- Subgenus: Mispila (Trichomispila); Breuning, 1939

Subgenus of beetles

Mispila (Trichomispila) is a subgenus of beetle in the genus Mispila. It was described by Stephan von Breuning in 1939.
