= Mispila (Mispila) =

Scientific classification
- Domain: Eukaryota
- Kingdom: Animalia
- Phylum: Arthropoda
- Class: Insecta
- Order: Coleoptera
- Suborder: Polyphaga
- Infraorder: Cucujiformia
- Family: Cerambycidae
- Genus: Mispila
- Subgenus: Mispila (Mispila); Pascoe, 1864

Subgenus of beetles

Mispila (Mispila) is a subgenus of beetle in the genus Mispila. It was described by Francis Polkinghorne Pascoe in 1864.
