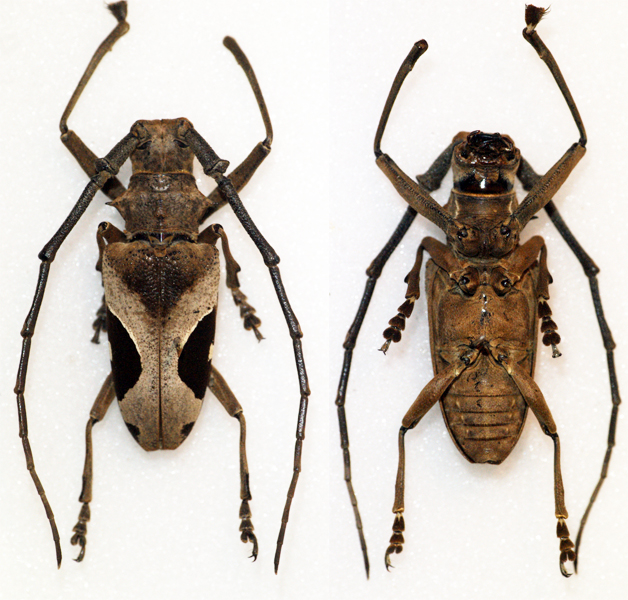

Scientific classification
- Kingdom: Animalia
- Phylum: Arthropoda
- Class: Insecta
- Order: Coleoptera
- Suborder: Polyphaga
- Infraorder: Cucujiformia
- Family: Cerambycidae
- Genus: Paraleprodera
- Species: P. triangularis

Binomial name
- Paraleprodera triangularis (Thomson, 1865)

Synonyms
- Epicedia triangularis Thomson, 1865; Paraleprodera lecta Gahan, 1888

= Paraleprodera triangularis =

Species of beetle

Paraleprodera triangularis is a species of beetle in the family Cerambycidae. It was described by James Thomson in 1865, originally under the genus Epicedia. It is known from India, Vietnam, Laos, Thailand, and Myanmar.
