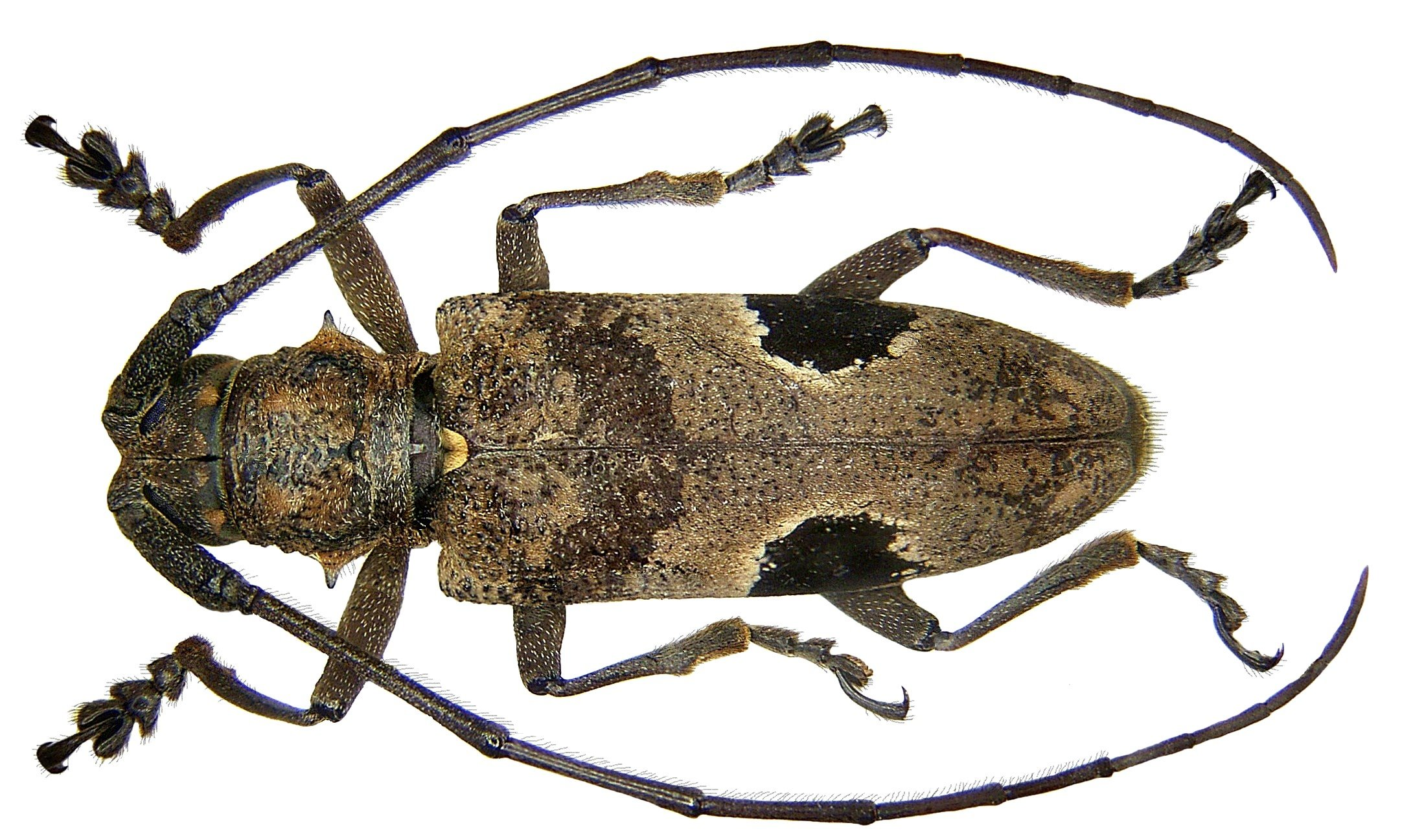
- size 26 mm

Scientific classification
- Kingdom: Animalia
- Phylum: Arthropoda
- Class: Insecta
- Order: Coleoptera
- Suborder: Polyphaga
- Infraorder: Cucujiformia
- Family: Cerambycidae
- Genus: Paraleprodera
- Species: P. insidiosa

Binomial name
- Paraleprodera insidiosa (Pascoe, 1888)

Synonyms
- Epepeotes imbasalis Pic, 1925; Leprodera insidiosa Pascoe, 1888

= Paraleprodera insidiosa =

Species of beetle

Paraleprodera insidiosa is a species of beetle in the family Cerambycidae. It was described by Francis Polkinghorne Pascoe in 1888, originally under the genus Leprodera. It is known from India, Myanmar, Malaysia, Laos, Taiwan, Cambodia, and Thailand. It contains the varietas Paraleprodera insidiosa var. unimaculata.
