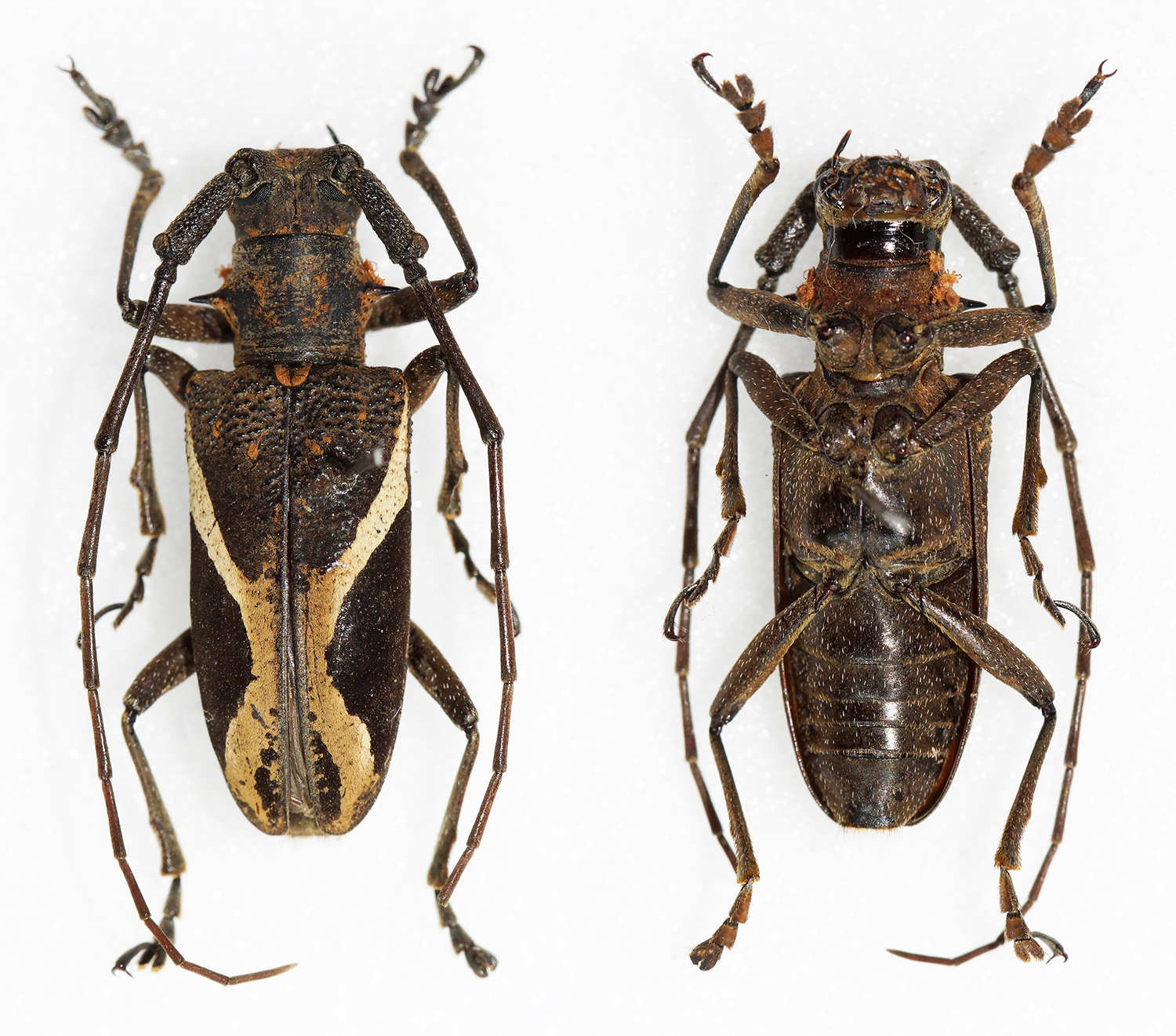

Scientific classification
- Kingdom: Animalia
- Phylum: Arthropoda
- Class: Insecta
- Order: Coleoptera
- Suborder: Polyphaga
- Infraorder: Cucujiformia
- Family: Cerambycidae
- Genus: Paraleprodera
- Species: P. stephanus

Binomial name
- Paraleprodera stephanus (White, 1858)

Synonyms
- Monohammus stephanus White, 1858; Monohammus officinator White, 1858; Archidice Quadrinotata Thomson, 1865; Leprodera stephana Gahan, 1894 (Missp.); Paraleprodera officinator m. flavomaculata Breuning, 1943 (Unav.); Paraleprodera stephanus m. fasciata Breuning, 1943 (Unav.); Paraleprodera stephana Lazarev, 2019 (Missp.)

= Paraleprodera stephanus =

Species of beetle

Paraleprodera stephanus is a species of beetle in the family Cerambycidae. It was described by White in 1858, originally under the genus Monohammus. It is known from India, China, Vietnam, Laos, Bhutan, and Nepal. Sources disagree as to the spelling and the synonymies associated with this taxon (e.g., compare to). The name "fasciata" is sometimes treated as a subspecies, but this name is unavailable under ICZN Art. 45.6.4, as it was described as infrasubspecific and not used as a valid name prior to 1985.
