= Leprodera verrucosa =

Scientific classification
- Kingdom: Animalia
- Phylum: Arthropoda
- Clade: Pancrustacea
- Class: Insecta
- Order: Coleoptera
- Suborder: Polyphaga
- Infraorder: Cucujiformia
- Family: Cerambycidae
- Genus: Leprodera
- Species: L. verrucosa

Binomial name
- Leprodera verrucosa Pascoe, 1866

Synonyms
- Leprodera arista J. Thomson, 1878

Species of beetle

Leprodera verrucosa is a species of beetle in the family Cerambycidae. It was described by Francis Polkinghorne Pascoe in 1866. It is known from Sumatra and Borneo.
