= Leprodera elongata =

Scientific classification
- Kingdom: Animalia
- Phylum: Arthropoda
- Clade: Pancrustacea
- Class: Insecta
- Order: Coleoptera
- Suborder: Polyphaga
- Infraorder: Cucujiformia
- Family: Cerambycidae
- Genus: Leprodera
- Species: L. elongata

Binomial name
- Leprodera elongata J. Thomson, 1857

Synonyms
- Leprodera equestris Pascoe, 1866

Species of beetle

Leprodera elongata is a species of beetle in the family Cerambycidae. It was described by James Thomson in 1857. It is known from Malaysia, Borneo, Java and Sumatra.
