= Paraleprodera malaccensis =

Scientific classification
- Kingdom: Animalia
- Phylum: Arthropoda
- Class: Insecta
- Order: Coleoptera
- Suborder: Polyphaga
- Infraorder: Cucujiformia
- Family: Cerambycidae
- Genus: Paraleprodera
- Species: P. malaccensis

Binomial name
- Paraleprodera malaccensis Breuning, 1936

Species of beetle

Paraleprodera malaccensis is a species of beetle in the family Cerambycidae. It was described by Stephan von Breuning in 1936. It is known from Malaysia.
