= Paraleprodera mesophthalma =

Scientific classification
- Kingdom: Animalia
- Phylum: Arthropoda
- Class: Insecta
- Order: Coleoptera
- Suborder: Polyphaga
- Infraorder: Cucujiformia
- Family: Cerambycidae
- Genus: Paraleprodera
- Species: P. mesophthalma

Binomial name
- Paraleprodera mesophthalma Bi & Lin, 2012

Species of beetle

Paraleprodera mesophthalma is a species of beetle in the family Cerambycidae. It was described by Bi and Lin in 2012. It is known from China.
