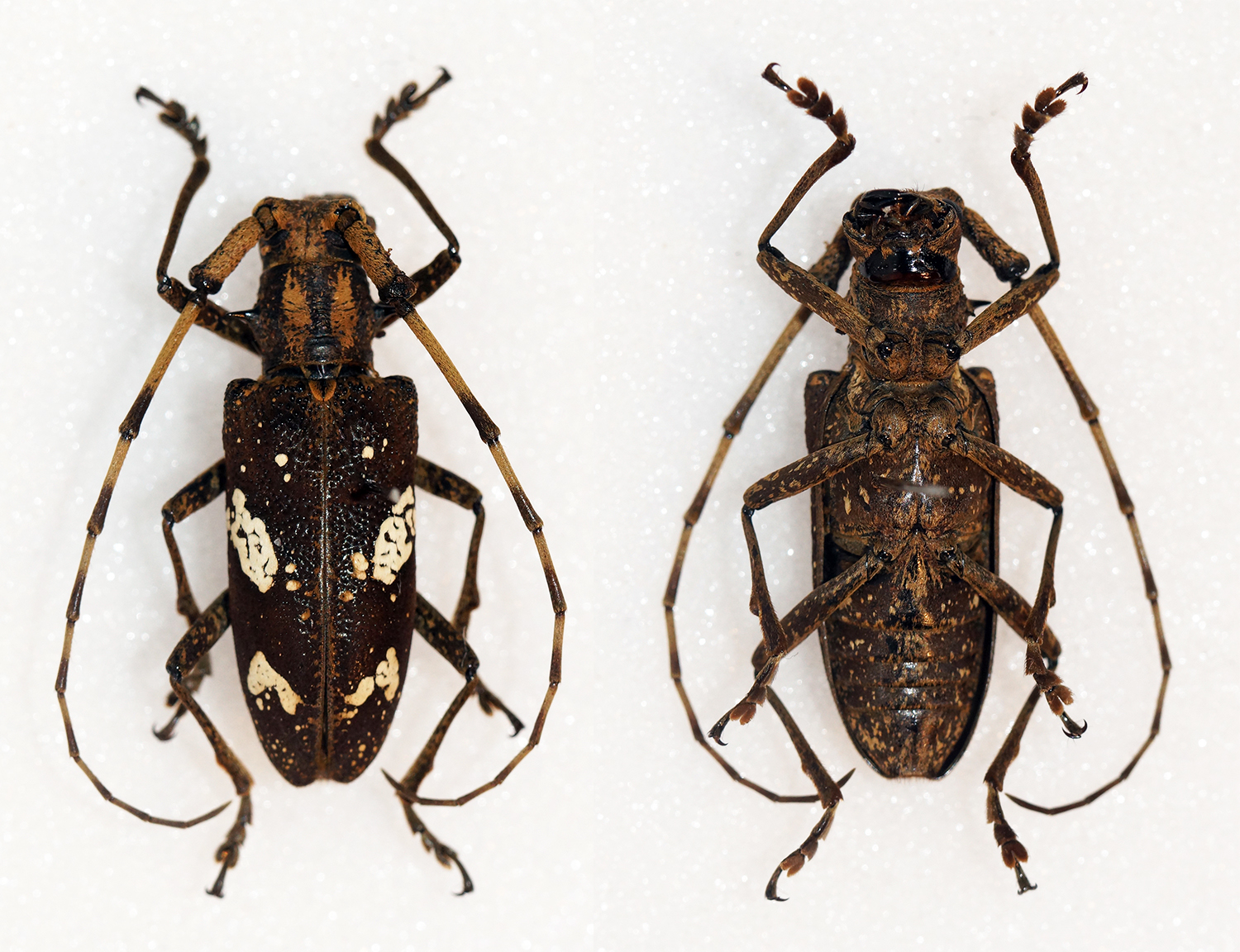
- Sex: Male, Size: 22mm

Scientific classification
- Kingdom: Animalia
- Phylum: Arthropoda
- Class: Insecta
- Order: Coleoptera
- Suborder: Polyphaga
- Infraorder: Cucujiformia
- Family: Cerambycidae
- Genus: Paraleprodera
- Species: P. itzingeri

Binomial name
- Paraleprodera itzingeri Breuning, 1935

Synonyms
- Archidice carolina (Fairmaire, 1901)

= Paraleprodera itzingeri =

Species of beetle

Paraleprodera itzingeri is a species of beetle in the family Cerambycidae. It was described by Stephan von Breuning in 1935. It is known from Taiwan.
