= Paraleprodera cordifera =

Scientific classification
- Kingdom: Animalia
- Phylum: Arthropoda
- Class: Insecta
- Order: Coleoptera
- Suborder: Polyphaga
- Infraorder: Cucujiformia
- Family: Cerambycidae
- Genus: Paraleprodera
- Species: P. cordifera

Binomial name
- Paraleprodera cordifera (Thomson, 1865)

Synonyms
- Archidice cordifer Thomson, 1865

Species of beetle

Paraleprodera cordifera is a species of beetle in the family Cerambycidae. It was described by James Thomson in 1865.
