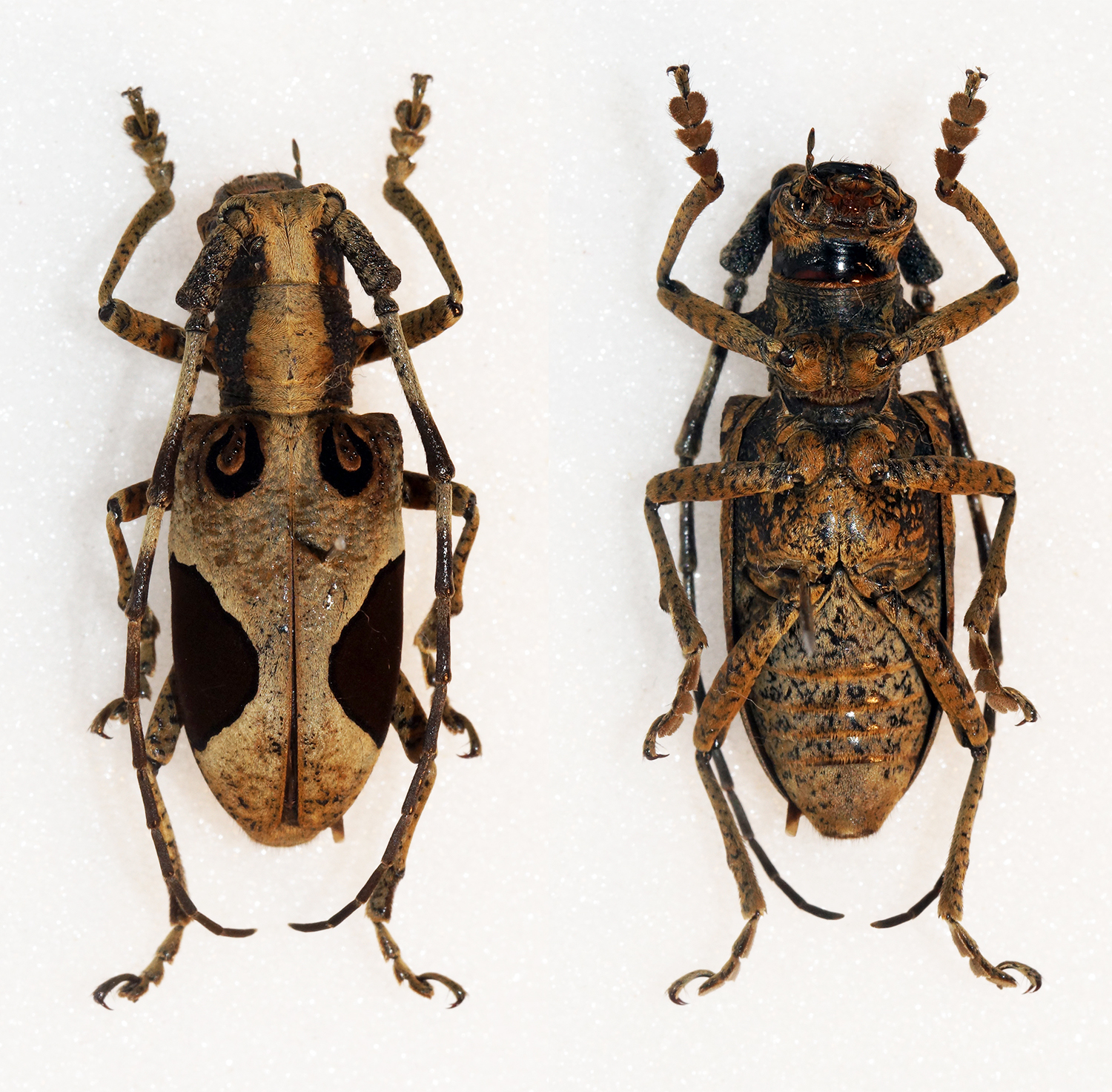

Scientific classification
- Kingdom: Animalia
- Phylum: Arthropoda
- Class: Insecta
- Order: Coleoptera
- Suborder: Polyphaga
- Infraorder: Cucujiformia
- Family: Cerambycidae
- Genus: Paraleprodera
- Species: P. diophthalma

Binomial name
- Paraleprodera diophthalma (Pascoe, 1857)

Synonyms
- Leprodera bioculata Fairmaire, 1900; Morimus diophthalmus Pascoe, 1857

= Paraleprodera diophthalma =

Species of beetle

Paraleprodera diophthalma is a species of beetle in the family Cerambycidae. It was described by Francis Polkinghorne Pascoe in 1857. It is known from Taiwan and China.

== Subspecies ==
- Paraleprodera diophthalma diophthalma (Pascoe, 1857)
- Paraleprodera diophthalma formosana (Schwarzer, 1925)
