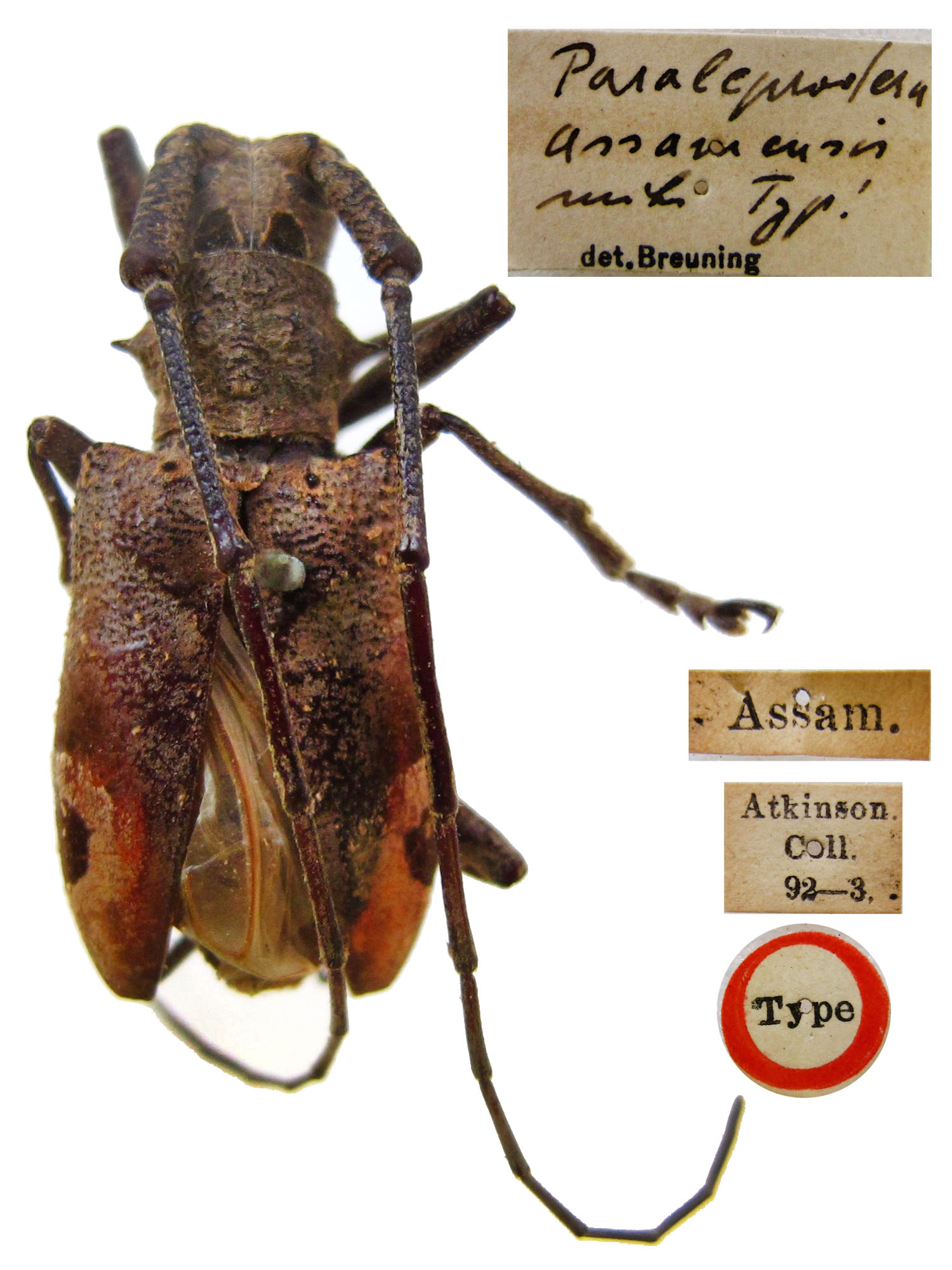

Scientific classification
- Kingdom: Animalia
- Phylum: Arthropoda
- Class: Insecta
- Order: Coleoptera
- Suborder: Polyphaga
- Infraorder: Cucujiformia
- Family: Cerambycidae
- Genus: Paraleprodera
- Species: P. bigemmata

Binomial name
- Paraleprodera bigemmata (Thomson, 1865)

Synonyms
- Epicedia bigemmata Thomson, 1865; Paraleprodera assamensis Breuning, 1935

= Paraleprodera bigemmata =

Species of beetle

Paraleprodera bigemmata is a species of beetle in the family Cerambycidae. It was described by James Thomson in 1865. It is known from India.
