= Paraleprodera crucifera =

Scientific classification
- Kingdom: Animalia
- Phylum: Arthropoda
- Class: Insecta
- Order: Coleoptera
- Suborder: Polyphaga
- Infraorder: Cucujiformia
- Family: Cerambycidae
- Genus: Paraleprodera
- Species: P. crucifera

Binomial name
- Paraleprodera crucifera (Fabricius, 1793)

Synonyms
- Cerambyx crucifer (Fabricius, 1793); Leprodera crucifera (Fabricius, 1793); Phryneta crucifera (Fabricius, 1793); Lamia crucifera Fabricius, 1793

Species of beetle

Paraleprodera crucifera is a species of beetle in the family Cerambycidae. It was described by Johan Christian Fabricius in 1793. It is known from Sri Lanka and India.
