= Epicedia wrayi =

Scientific classification
- Kingdom: Animalia
- Phylum: Arthropoda
- Class: Insecta
- Order: Coleoptera
- Suborder: Polyphaga
- Infraorder: Cucujiformia
- Family: Cerambycidae
- Genus: Epicedia
- Species: E. wrayi

Binomial name
- Epicedia wrayi Waterhouse, 1887

Species of beetle

Epicedia wrayi is a species of beetle in the family Cerambycidae and the subfamily of Lamiinae. It was described by Waterhouse in 1887. It is known from Malaysia.
