= Paraleprodera carolina =

Scientific classification
- Kingdom: Animalia
- Phylum: Arthropoda
- Class: Insecta
- Order: Coleoptera
- Suborder: Polyphaga
- Infraorder: Cucujiformia
- Family: Cerambycidae
- Genus: Paraleprodera
- Species: P. carolina

Binomial name
- Paraleprodera carolina (Fairmaire, 1900)

Synonyms
- Archidice cxarolina Fairmaire, 1899; Epicedia carolina (Fairmaire, 1900)

Species of beetle

Paraleprodera carolina is a species of beetle in the family Cerambycidae. It was described by Léon Fairmaire in 1900. It is known from China.
