= Paraleprodera corrugata =

Scientific classification
- Kingdom: Animalia
- Phylum: Arthropoda
- Class: Insecta
- Order: Coleoptera
- Suborder: Polyphaga
- Infraorder: Cucujiformia
- Family: Cerambycidae
- Genus: Paraleprodera
- Species: P. corrugata

Binomial name
- Paraleprodera corrugata Breuning, 1935

Synonyms
- Paraleprodera corrugatoides Breuning, 1948

Species of beetle

Paraleprodera corrugata is a species of beetle in the family Cerambycidae. It was described by Stephan von Breuning in 1935.
