= Paraleprodera javanica =

Scientific classification
- Kingdom: Animalia
- Phylum: Arthropoda
- Clade: Pancrustacea
- Class: Insecta
- Order: Coleoptera
- Suborder: Polyphaga
- Infraorder: Cucujiformia
- Family: Cerambycidae
- Genus: Paraleprodera
- Species: P. javanica

Binomial name
- Paraleprodera javanica Breuning, 1943

Species of beetle

Paraleprodera javanica is a species of beetle in the family Cerambycidae. It was described by Stephan von Breuning in 1943. It is known from Java.
