= Paraleprodera vicina =

Scientific classification
- Kingdom: Animalia
- Phylum: Arthropoda
- Clade: Pancrustacea
- Class: Insecta
- Order: Coleoptera
- Suborder: Polyphaga
- Infraorder: Cucujiformia
- Family: Cerambycidae
- Genus: Paraleprodera
- Species: P. vicina

Binomial name
- Paraleprodera vicina Breuning, 1940

Species of beetle

Paraleprodera vicina is a species of beetle in the family Cerambycidae. It was described by Stephan von Breuning in 1940. It is known from Java.
