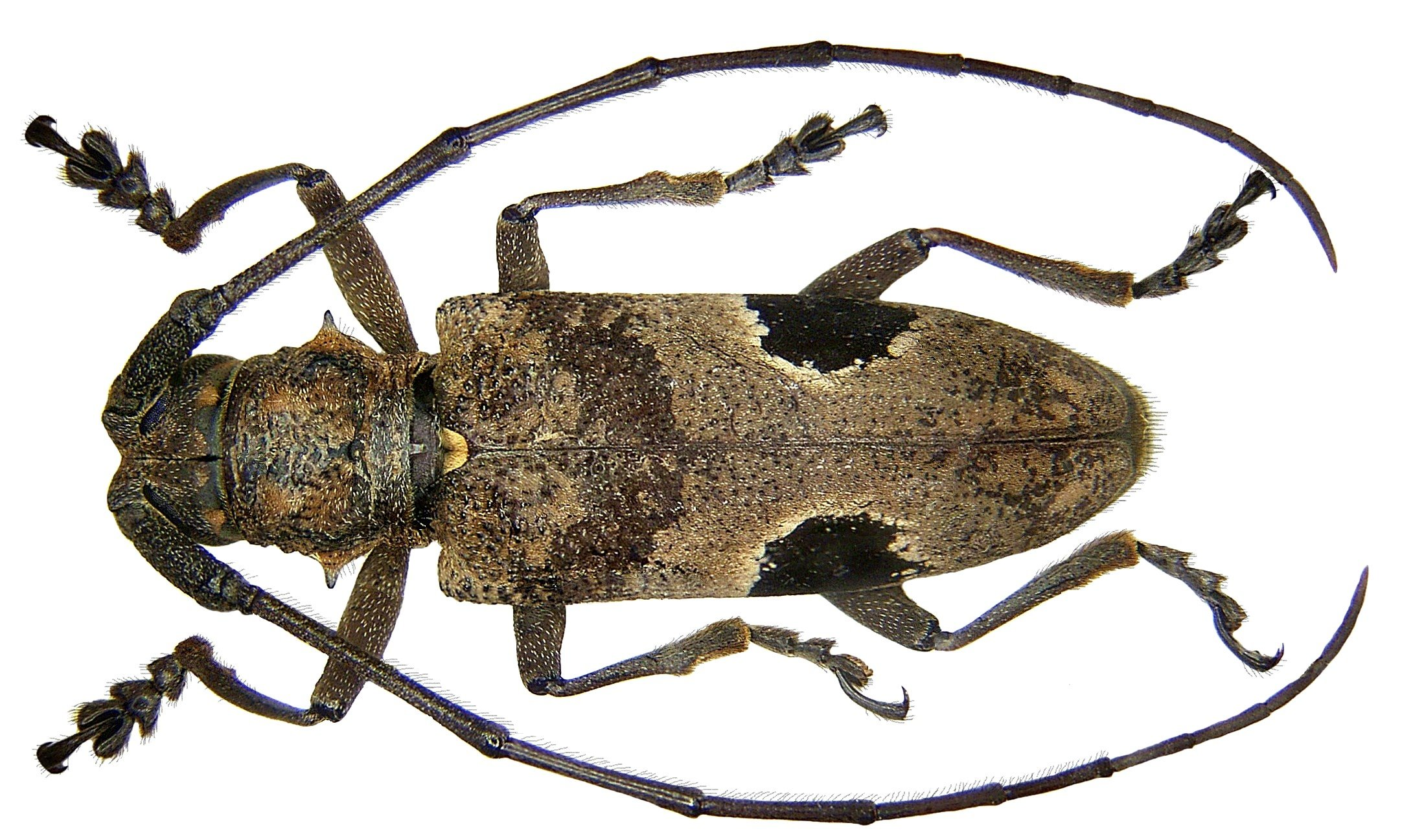
- Paraleprodera insidiosa

Scientific classification
- Kingdom: Animalia
- Phylum: Arthropoda
- Class: Insecta
- Order: Coleoptera
- Suborder: Polyphaga
- Infraorder: Cucujiformia
- Family: Cerambycidae
- Tribe: Lamiini
- Genus: Paraleprodera; Breuning, 1935

= Paraleprodera =

Genus of beetles

Paraleprodera is a genus of longhorn beetles of the subfamily Lamiinae, containing the following species:

- Paraleprodera assamensis Breuning, 1935
- Paraleprodera bigemmata (Thomson, 1865)
- Paraleprodera bisignata (Gahan, 1895)
- Paraleprodera carolina (Fairmaire, 1900)
- Paraleprodera cordifera (Thomson, 1865)
- Paraleprodera corrugata Breuning, 1935
- Paraleprodera crucifera (Fabricius, 1793)
- Paraleprodera diophthalma (Pascoe, 1857)
- Paraleprodera epicedioides (Pascoe, 1866)
- Paraleprodera flavoplagiata Breuning, 1938
- Paraleprodera insidiosa (Pascoe, 1888)
- Paraleprodera itzingeri Breuning, 1935
- Paraleprodera javanica Breuning, 1943
- Paraleprodera malaccensis Breuning, 1936
- Paraleprodera mesophthalma Bi & Lin, 2012
- Paraleprodera stephanus (White, 1858)
- Paraleprodera tonkinensis Breuning, 1954
- Paraleprodera triangularis (Thomson, 1865)
- Paraleprodera vicina Breuning, 1940
