= Epicedia maculatrix =

Scientific classification
- Kingdom: Animalia
- Phylum: Arthropoda
- Clade: Pancrustacea
- Class: Insecta
- Order: Coleoptera
- Suborder: Polyphaga
- Infraorder: Cucujiformia
- Family: Cerambycidae
- Genus: Epicedia
- Species: E. maculatrix

Binomial name
- Epicedia maculatrix (Perty, 1831)

Synonyms
- Lamia carceli Guérin-Méneville in Bélanger, 1834; Lamia maculatrix Perty, 1831; Leprodera pleuricosta J. Thomson, 1857

Species of beetle

Epicedia maculatrix is a species of beetle in the family Cerambycidae. It was described by Perty in 1831. It is known from Java, Borneo, Thailand, and Sumatra.
