= Paraleprodera bisignata =

Scientific classification
- Kingdom: Animalia
- Phylum: Arthropoda
- Class: Insecta
- Order: Coleoptera
- Suborder: Polyphaga
- Infraorder: Cucujiformia
- Family: Cerambycidae
- Genus: Paraleprodera
- Species: P. bisignata

Binomial name
- Paraleprodera bisignata (Gahan, 1895)

Species of beetle

Paraleprodera bisignata is a species of beetle in the family Cerambycidae. It was described by Charles Joseph Gahan in 1895.
