= Epicedia trimaculata =

Scientific classification
- Kingdom: Animalia
- Phylum: Arthropoda
- Clade: Pancrustacea
- Class: Insecta
- Order: Coleoptera
- Suborder: Polyphaga
- Infraorder: Cucujiformia
- Family: Cerambycidae
- Genus: Epicedia
- Species: E. trimaculata

Binomial name
- Epicedia trimaculata (Chevrolat, 1856)

Synonyms
- Leprodera plagiata J. Thomson, 1857; Leprodera trimaculata Chevrolat, 1856

Species of beetle

Epicedia trimaculata is a species of beetle in the family Cerambycidae. It was described by Louis Alexandre Auguste Chevrolat in 1856. It is known from Borneo, Malaysia and Java.
