= Epicedia =

Scientific classification
- Kingdom: Animalia
- Phylum: Arthropoda
- Class: Insecta
- Order: Coleoptera
- Suborder: Polyphaga
- Infraorder: Cucujiformia
- Family: Cerambycidae
- Tribe: Lamiini
- Genus: Epicedia

Genus of beetles

Epicedia is a genus of longhorn beetles of the subfamily Lamiinae, containing the following species:

- Epicedia maculatrix (Perty, 1831)
- Epicedia trimaculata (Chevrolat, 1856)
- Epicedia wrayi Waterhouse, 1887
