= Leprodera =

Scientific classification
- Domain: Eukaryota
- Kingdom: Animalia
- Phylum: Arthropoda
- Class: Insecta
- Order: Coleoptera
- Suborder: Polyphaga
- Infraorder: Cucujiformia
- Family: Cerambycidae
- Tribe: Lamiini
- Genus: Leprodera

Genus of beetles

Leprodera is a genus of longhorn beetles of the subfamily Lamiinae, containing the following species:

- Leprodera elongata J. Thomson, 1857
- Leprodera verrucosa Pascoe, 1866
