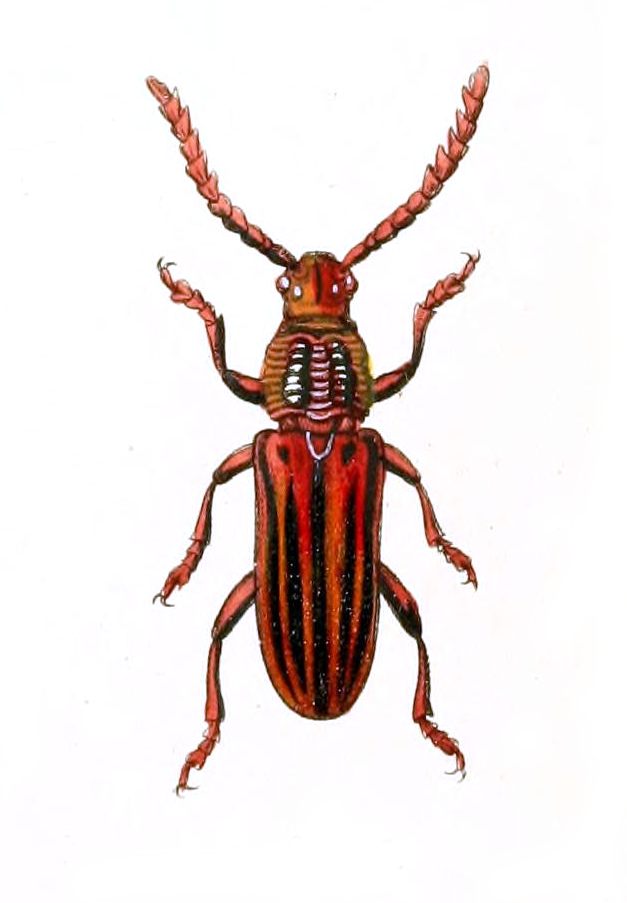
- Pachylocerus corallinus

Scientific classification
- Kingdom: Animalia
- Phylum: Arthropoda
- Clade: Pancrustacea
- Class: Insecta
- Order: Coleoptera
- Suborder: Polyphaga
- Infraorder: Cucujiformia
- Family: Cerambycidae
- Subfamily: Cerambycinae
- Tribe: Pyrestini; Lacordaire, 1869

= Pyrestini =

Tribe of beetles

Pyrestini is a tribe of beetles in the subfamily Cerambycinae, containing the following genera most of which are from the Oriental region, many being reddish in colour:

- Cymaterus
- Erythresthes
- Erythrus
- Pachylocerus
- Plutonesthes
- Pyrestes
