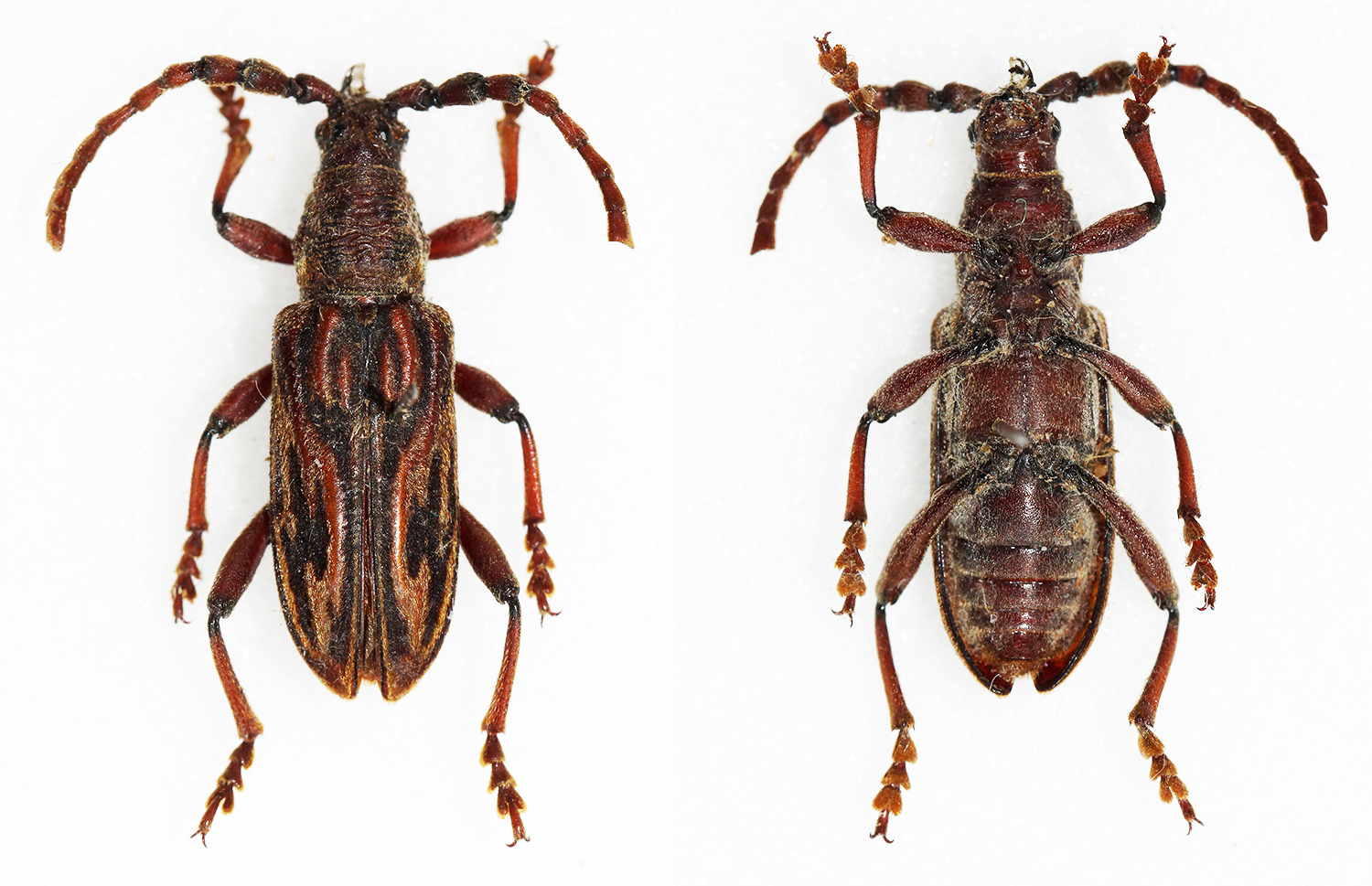

Scientific classification
- Kingdom: Animalia
- Phylum: Arthropoda
- Class: Insecta
- Order: Coleoptera
- Suborder: Polyphaga
- Infraorder: Cucujiformia
- Family: Cerambycidae
- Genus: Pachylocerus
- Species: P. sulcatus

Binomial name
- Pachylocerus sulcatus Brongniart, 1891

= Pachylocerus sulcatus =

Species of beetle

Pachylocerus sulcatus is a species of beetle in the family Cerambycidae. It is found in Southeast Asia from northeastern India to Vietnam.
