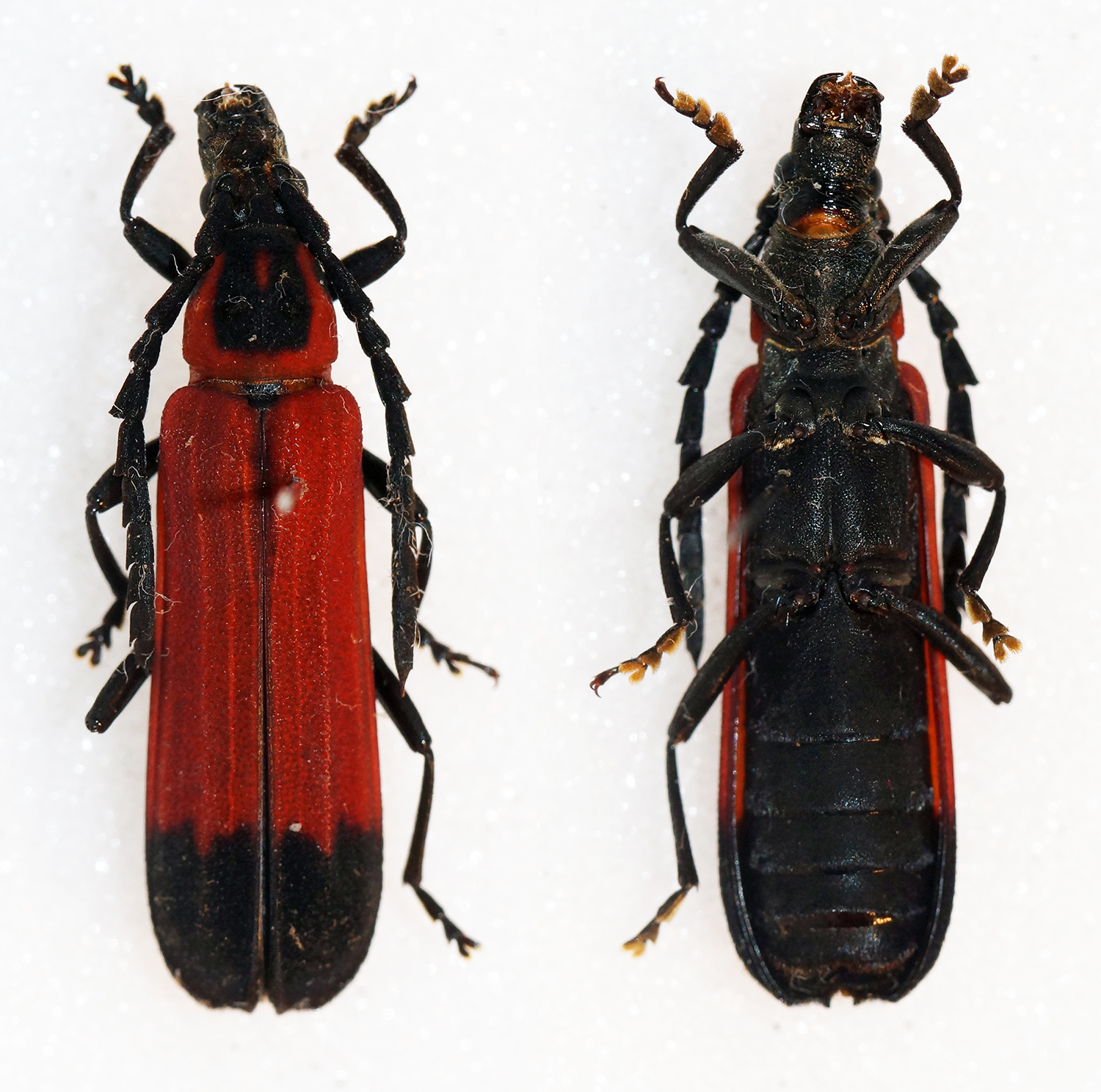
- Erythrus sabahanus

Scientific classification
- Kingdom: Animalia
- Phylum: Arthropoda
- Class: Insecta
- Order: Coleoptera
- Suborder: Polyphaga
- Infraorder: Cucujiformia
- Family: Cerambycidae
- Tribe: Pyrestini
- Genus: Erythrus; White, 1853

= Erythrus =

Genus of beetles

Erythrus is a genus of longhorn beetles in the subfamily Cerambycinae.

== List of species ==
- Erythrus angustatus Pic, 1916
- Erythrus apicalis Pic, 1922
- Erythrus apiculatus Pascoe, 1866
- Erythrus ardens Holzschuh, 2011
- Erythrus argutus Holzschuh, 2010
- Erythrus assimilis Aurivillius, 1910
- Erythrus atricollis Pascoe, 1866
- Erythrus atrofuscus Hayashi, 1977
- Erythrus axillaris Aurivillius, 1910
- Erythrus biapicatus Gahan, 1902
- Erythrus bicolor (Westwood, 1848)
- Erythrus biimpressus Pic, 1943
- Erythrus bimaculatus Aurivillius, 1910
- Erythrus blairi Gressitt, 1939
- Erythrus championi White, 1853
- Erythrus coccineus Gahan, 1906
- Erythrus concisus Holzschuh, 2011
- Erythrus congruus Pascoe, 1863
- Erythrus crinitoguttatus Holzschuh, 2006
- Erythrus deceptor Holzschuh, 2010
- Erythrus dentipes Holzschuh, 2009
- Erythrus formosanus Bates, 1866
- Erythrus fortunei White, 1853
- Erythrus fruhstorferi Pic, 1943
- Erythrus fuscescens Holzschuh, 2009
- Erythrus gilvellus Holzschuh, 2006
- Erythrus grandis Vives, 2011
- Erythrus ignitus Pascoe, 1866
- Erythrus intextus Holzschuh, 2011
- Erythrus lacertosus Pascoe, 1866
- Erythrus laosensis Gressitt & Rondon, 1970
- Erythrus laticornis Fairmaire, 1895
- Erythrus ligystropteroides (Lansberge, 1884)
- Erythrus lineatus Pic, 1943
- Erythrus longipennis Pic, 1943
- Erythrus magnus Holzschuh, 2010
- Erythrus montanus Gressitt & Rondon, 1970
- Erythrus multimaculatus Pic, 1916
- Erythrus nayani Holzschuh, 2010
- Erythrus ochreatus Holzschuh, 2010
- Erythrus palliatus (Lansberge, 1884)
- Erythrus putus Holzschuh, 2011
- Erythrus quadrimaculatus Pic, 1916
- Erythrus quadrisignatus Pic, 1943
- Erythrus rhombeus Holzschuh, 2011
- Erythrus rothschildi Ritsema, 1895
- Erythrus rotundicollis Gahan, 1902
- Erythrus rubriceps Pic, 1916
- Erythrus sabahanus Vives, 2010
- Erythrus serratus Holzschuh, 2009
- Erythrus stenideus Holzschuh, 2009
- Erythrus sternalis Gahan, 1902
- Erythrus suturellus Holzschuh, 1984
- Erythrus taiwanicus Heyrovský, 1952
- Erythrus varicolor Holzschuh, 2010
- Erythrus viridipennis Gahan, 1902
- Erythrus westwoodii White, 1853
- Erythrus wuggenigi Holzschuh, 2010
