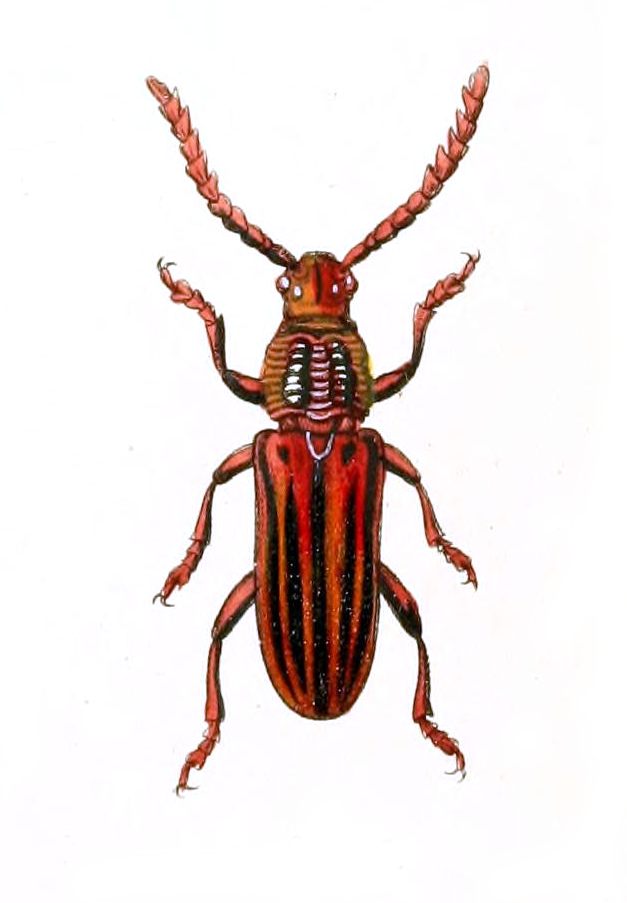
- Pachylocerus corallinus

Scientific classification
- Domain: Eukaryota
- Kingdom: Animalia
- Phylum: Arthropoda
- Class: Insecta
- Order: Coleoptera
- Suborder: Polyphaga
- Infraorder: Cucujiformia
- Family: Cerambycidae
- Tribe: Pyrestini
- Genus: Pachylocerus; Hope, 1834

Type species
- Pachylocerus corallinus

= Pachylocerus =

Genus of beetles

Pachylocerus is a genus of longhorn beetles in the subfamily Cerambycinae. Species in the genus are found only in the Oriental (Indo-Malayan) region.

== List of species ==
- Pachylocerus bawangensis Vives & Heffern, 2016
- Pachylocerus corallinus Hope, 1834
- Pachylocerus crassicornis (Olivier, 1795)
- Pachylocerus nayani Vives, 2010
- Pachylocerus parvus Gahan, 1907
- Pachylocerus pilosus Guérin-Méneville, 1844
- Pachylocerus plagiatus Gahan, 1907
- Pachylocerus sabahanus Vives & Heffern, 2012
- Pachylocerus sulcatus Brongniart, 1891
- Pachylocerus unicolor Dohrn, 1878
