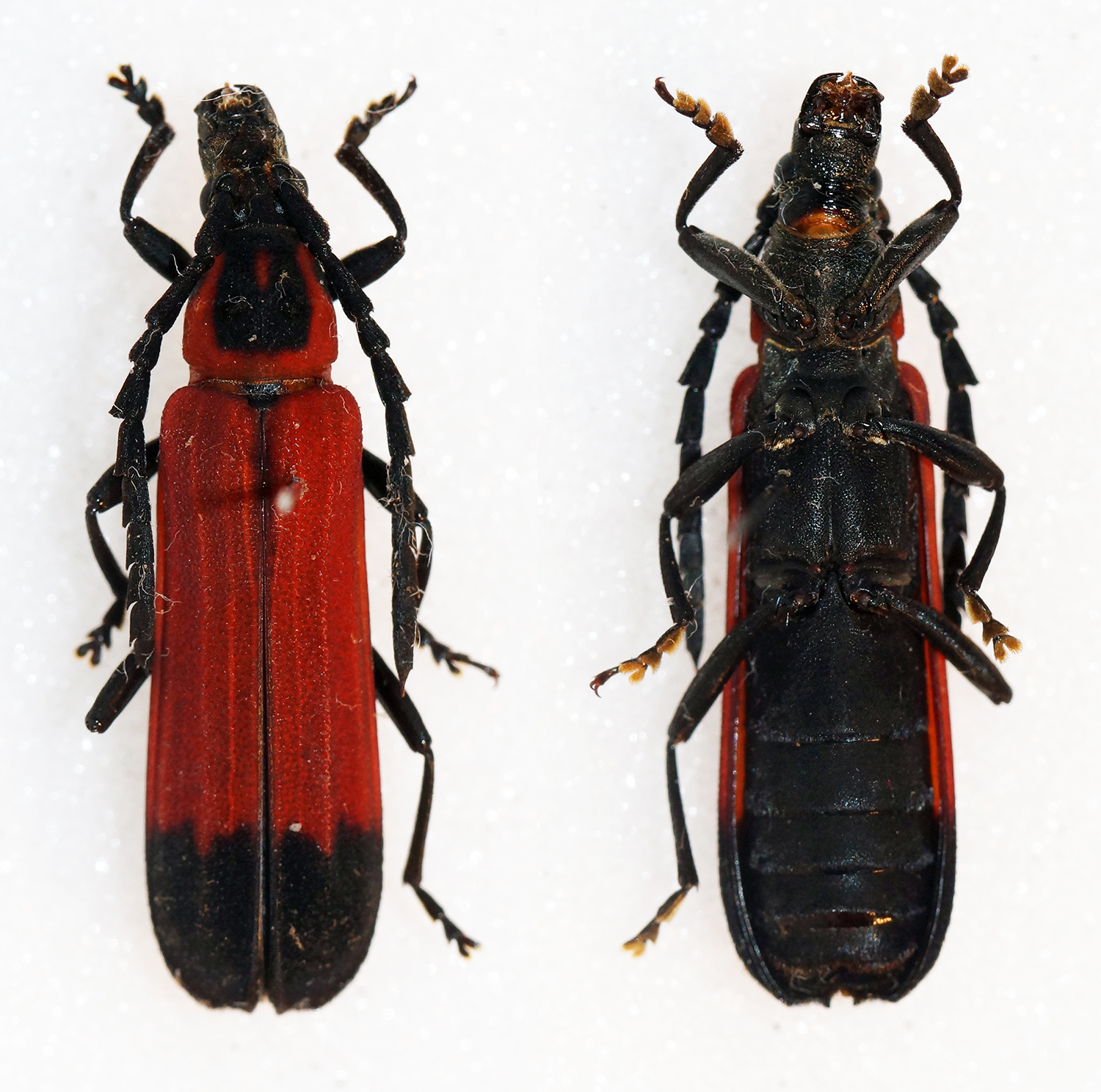

Scientific classification
- Kingdom: Animalia
- Phylum: Arthropoda
- Class: Insecta
- Order: Coleoptera
- Suborder: Polyphaga
- Infraorder: Cucujiformia
- Family: Cerambycidae
- Genus: Erythrus
- Species: E. sabahanus

Binomial name
- Erythrus sabahanus Vives, 2010

= Erythrus sabahanus =

Species of beetle

Erythrus sabahanus is a species of beetle in the family Cerambycidae found in Asia in countries such as Malaysia.
