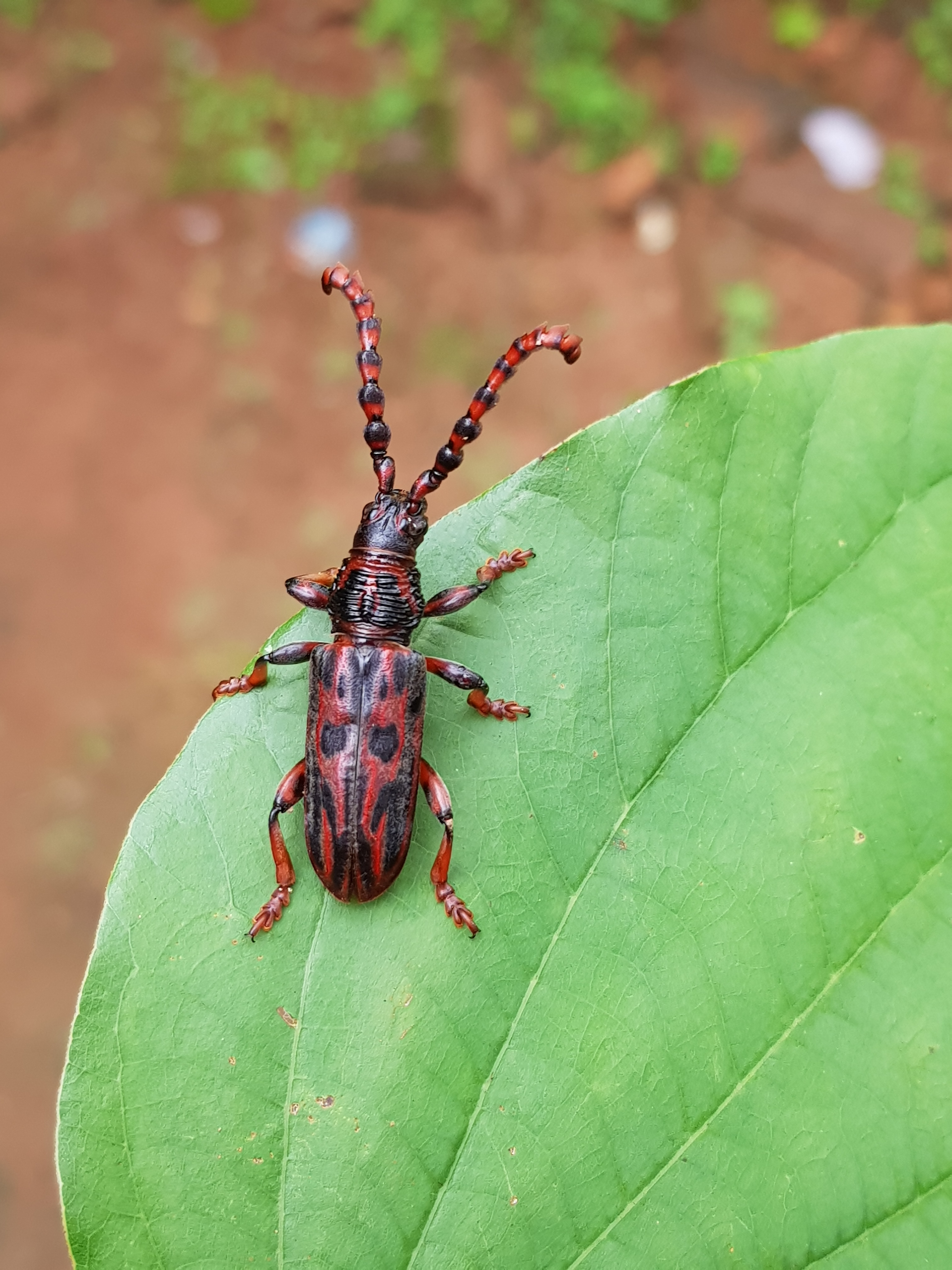
- From Kerala, India

Scientific classification
- Kingdom: Animalia
- Phylum: Arthropoda
- Clade: Pancrustacea
- Class: Insecta
- Order: Coleoptera
- Suborder: Polyphaga
- Infraorder: Cucujiformia
- Family: Cerambycidae
- Genus: Pachylocerus
- Species: P. crassicornis

Binomial name
- Pachylocerus crassicornis (Olivier, 1795)

= Pachylocerus crassicornis =

Species of beetle

Pachylocerus crassicornis is a species of long-horned beetle found in Peninsular India known from Chota Nagpur south to Kerala.
