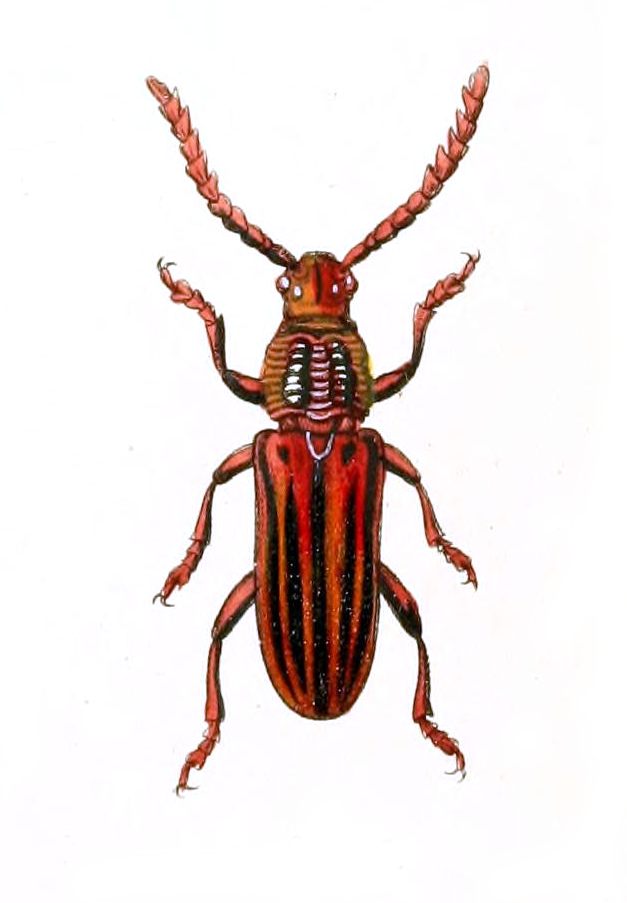

Scientific classification
- Domain: Eukaryota
- Kingdom: Animalia
- Phylum: Arthropoda
- Class: Insecta
- Order: Coleoptera
- Suborder: Polyphaga
- Infraorder: Cucujiformia
- Family: Cerambycidae
- Genus: Pachylocerus
- Species: P. corallinus

Binomial name
- Pachylocerus corallinus Hope, 1834

= Pachylocerus corallinus =

Species of beetle

Pachylocerus corallinus is a species of beetle in the family Cerambycidae. It is found in southwestern India. It was first described and given its binomial name by Frederick William Hope who examined a specimen from the cabinet of Captain Thomas Smee of the Indian Navy who had obtained it from a prickly pear in the vicinity of "Omlecope Dawar" (possibly "Ontikoppa" near Dharwad).

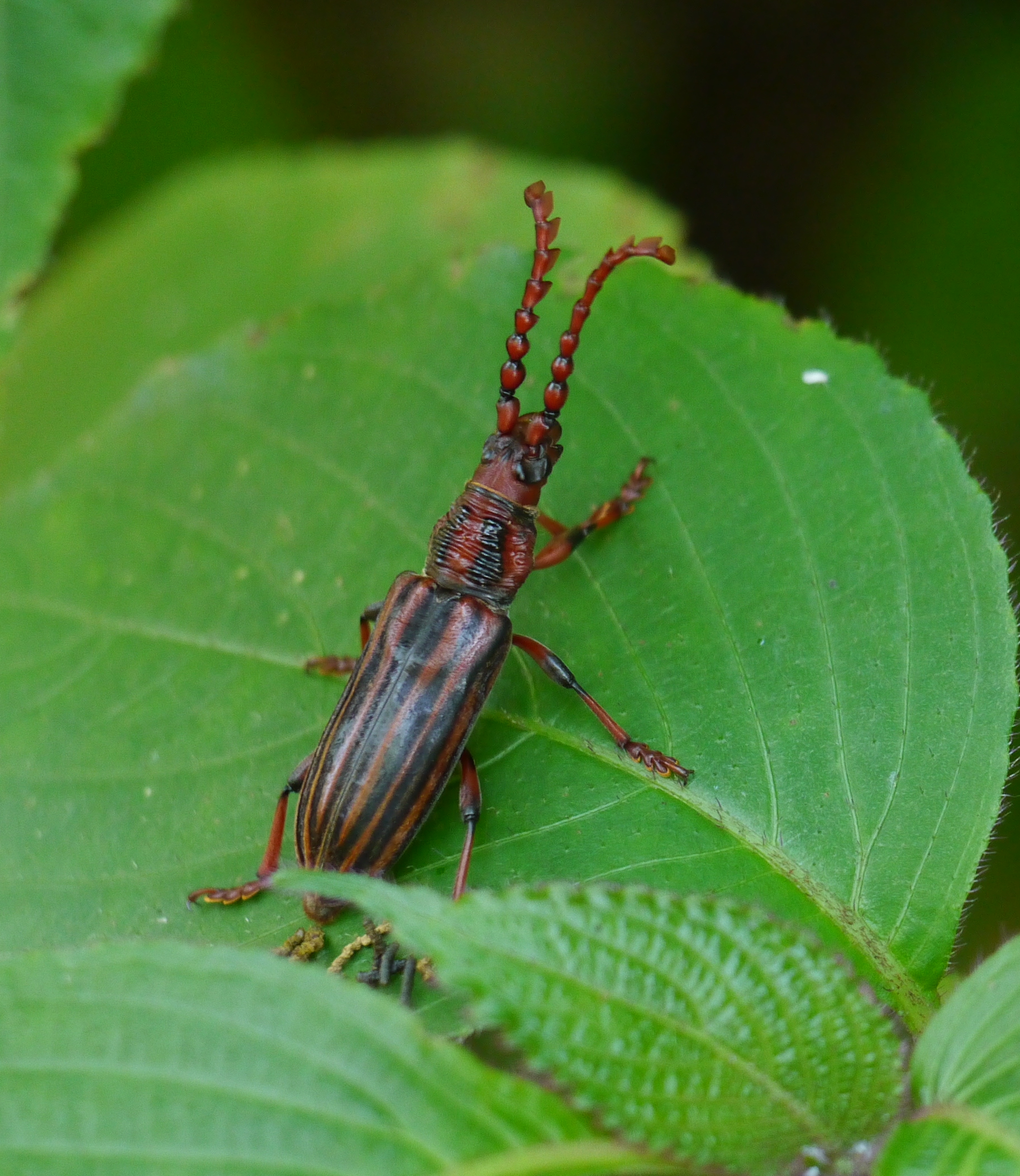

Specimens have been recorded from as far north as Bombay, south through Matheran, Goa, to Mangalore. In this genus, the eyes are divided. The antennae are short and do not reach past the middle of the elytra in the male and are even shorter in the female.
