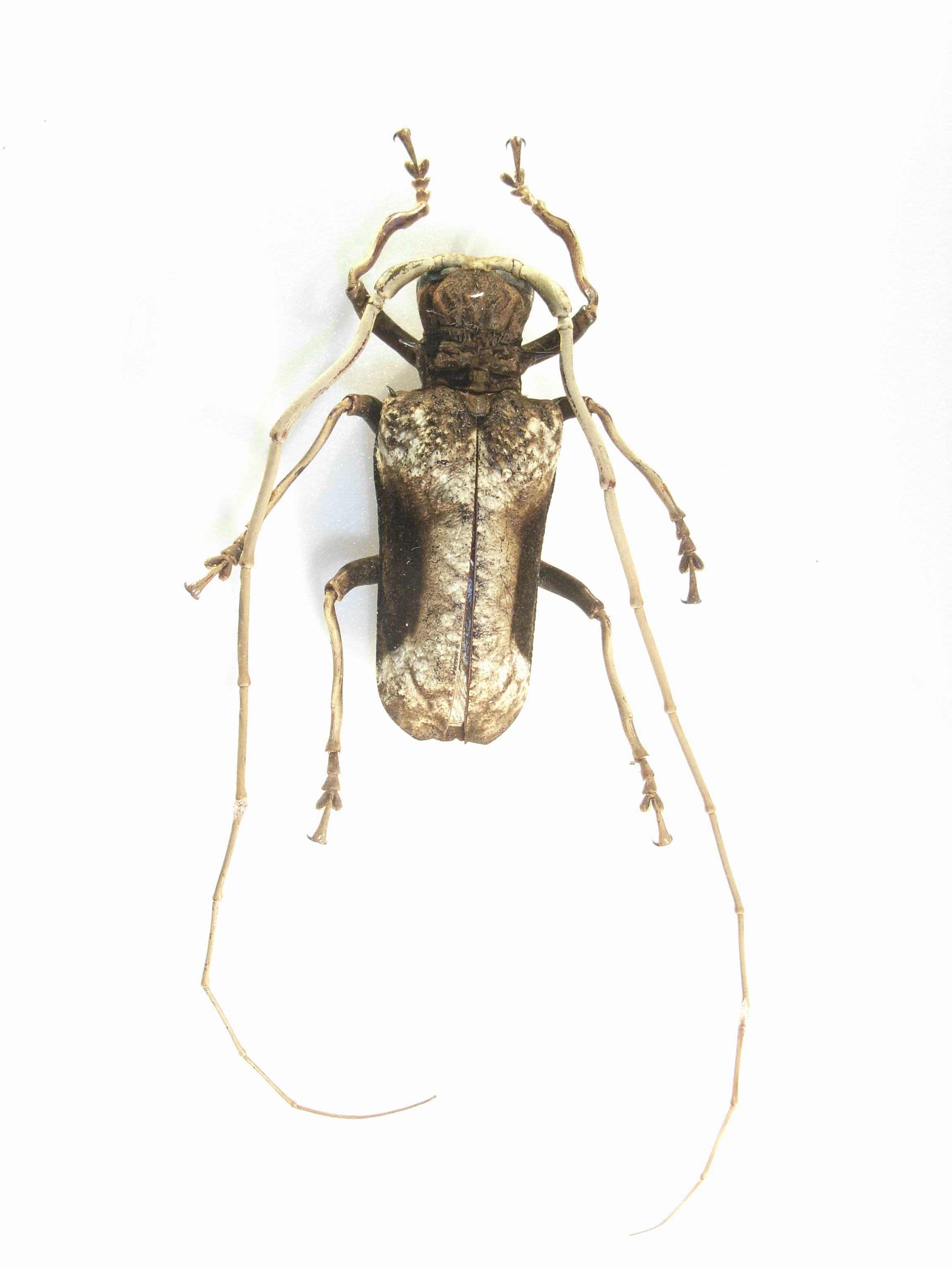
- Petrognatha gigas

Scientific classification
- Kingdom: Animalia
- Phylum: Arthropoda
- Class: Insecta
- Order: Coleoptera
- Suborder: Polyphaga
- Infraorder: Cucujiformia
- Family: Cerambycidae
- Subfamily: Lamiinae
- Tribe: Petrognathini; Blanchard, 1845

= Petrognathini =

Tribe of beetles

Petrognathini is a tribe of longhorn beetles of the subfamily Lamiinae. It was described by Blanchard in 1845.

== Taxonomy ==
- Capitocrassus Van Eecke, 1921
- Falsimalmus Breuning, 1956
- Ioesse Thomson, 1864
- Ithocritus Lacordaire, 1872
- Lentalius Fairmaire, 1904
- Parajoesse Breuning, 1982
- Petrognatha Leach, 1819
- Pseudapriona Breuning, 1936
- Threnetica Thomson, 1868
