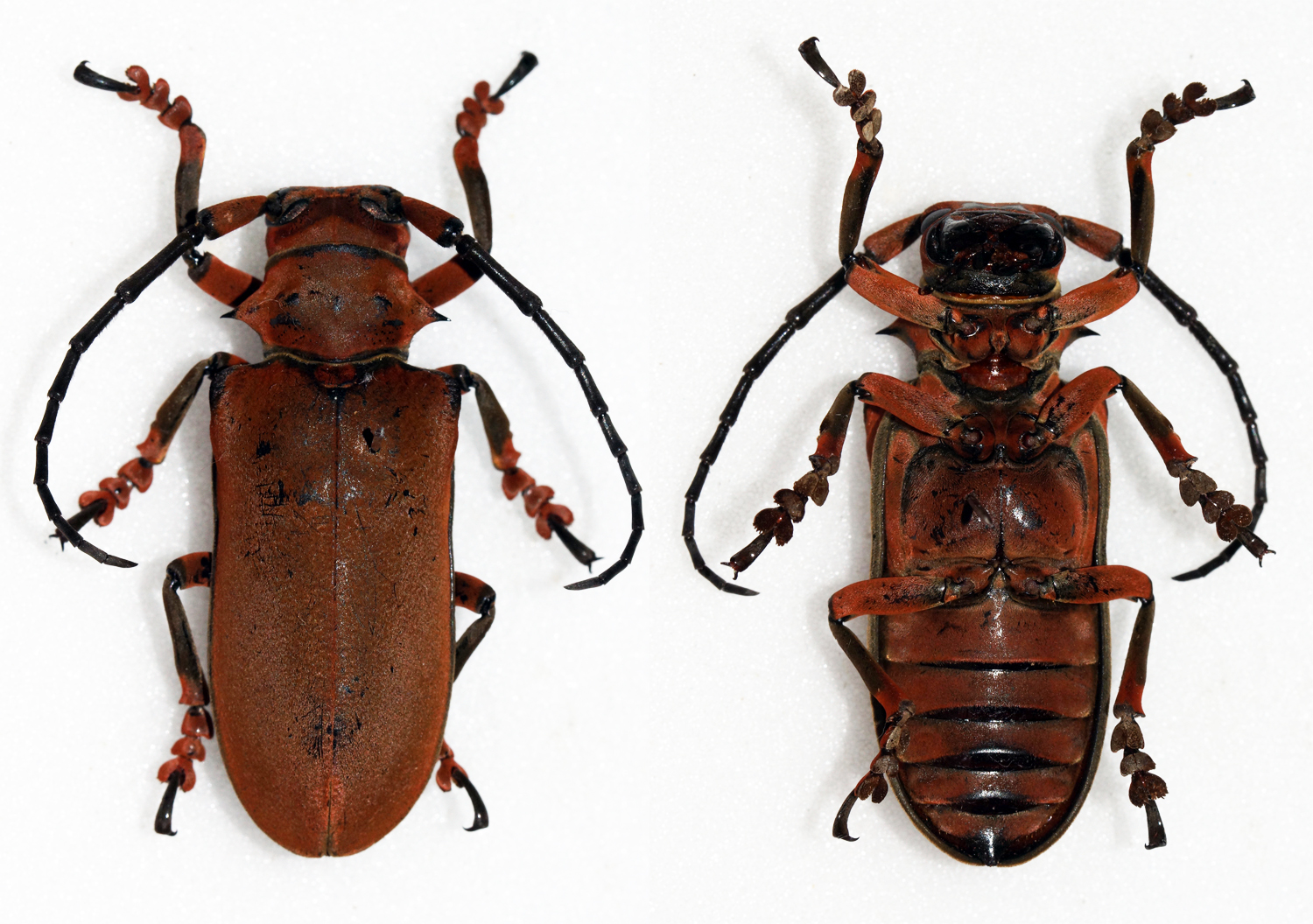
- Ioesse sanguinolenta

Scientific classification
- Kingdom: Animalia
- Phylum: Arthropoda
- Class: Insecta
- Order: Coleoptera
- Suborder: Polyphaga
- Infraorder: Cucujiformia
- Family: Cerambycidae
- Tribe: Petrognathini
- Genus: Ioesse

= Ioesse =

Genus of beetles

Ioesse is a genus of longhorn beetles of the subfamily Lamiinae, containing the following species:

- Ioesse putaoensis Ohbayashi & Lin, 2012
- Ioesse rubra (Pic, 1925)
- Ioesse sanguinolenta Thomson, 1864
