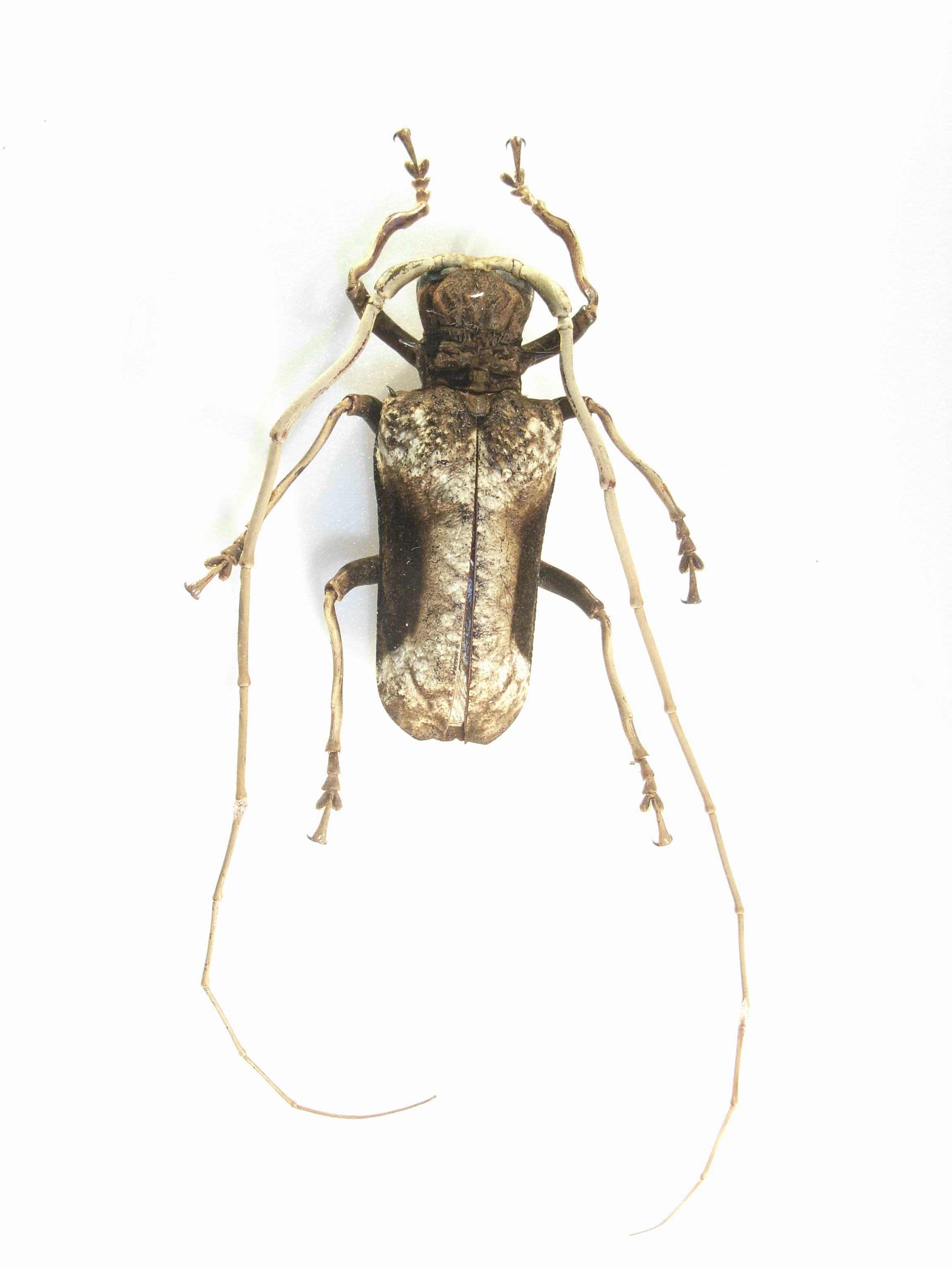

Scientific classification
- Domain: Eukaryota
- Kingdom: Animalia
- Phylum: Arthropoda
- Class: Insecta
- Order: Coleoptera
- Suborder: Polyphaga
- Infraorder: Cucujiformia
- Family: Cerambycidae
- Tribe: Petrognathini
- Genus: Petrognatha; Fabricius, 1792
- Species: P. gigas

Binomial name
- Petrognatha gigas (Fabricius, 1792)

= Petrognatha =

Genus of beetles

Petrognatha is a monotypic longhorn beetle genus belonging to the subfamily Lamiinae, tribe Petrognathini. It was described by Johan Christian Fabricius in 1792. Its only species, Petrognatha gigas, the giant African longhorn beetle, described in the same year by Fabricius, is found in Central Africa.

The larvae bore into the wood of fallen Acacia trees and the adults strongly resemble the bark. Furthermore, the antennae and legs resemble twigs when they are extended forward.
