= Parajoesse =

Scientific classification
- Kingdom: Animalia
- Phylum: Arthropoda
- Class: Insecta
- Order: Coleoptera
- Suborder: Polyphaga
- Infraorder: Cucujiformia
- Family: Cerambycidae
- Tribe: Petrognathini
- Genus: Parajoesse
- Species: P. nagaensis

Binomial name
- Parajoesse nagaensis Breuning, 1982

Genus of beetles

Parajoesse nagaensis is a species of beetle in the family Cerambycidae, and the only species in the genus Parajoesse. It was described by Stephan von Breuning in 1982.
