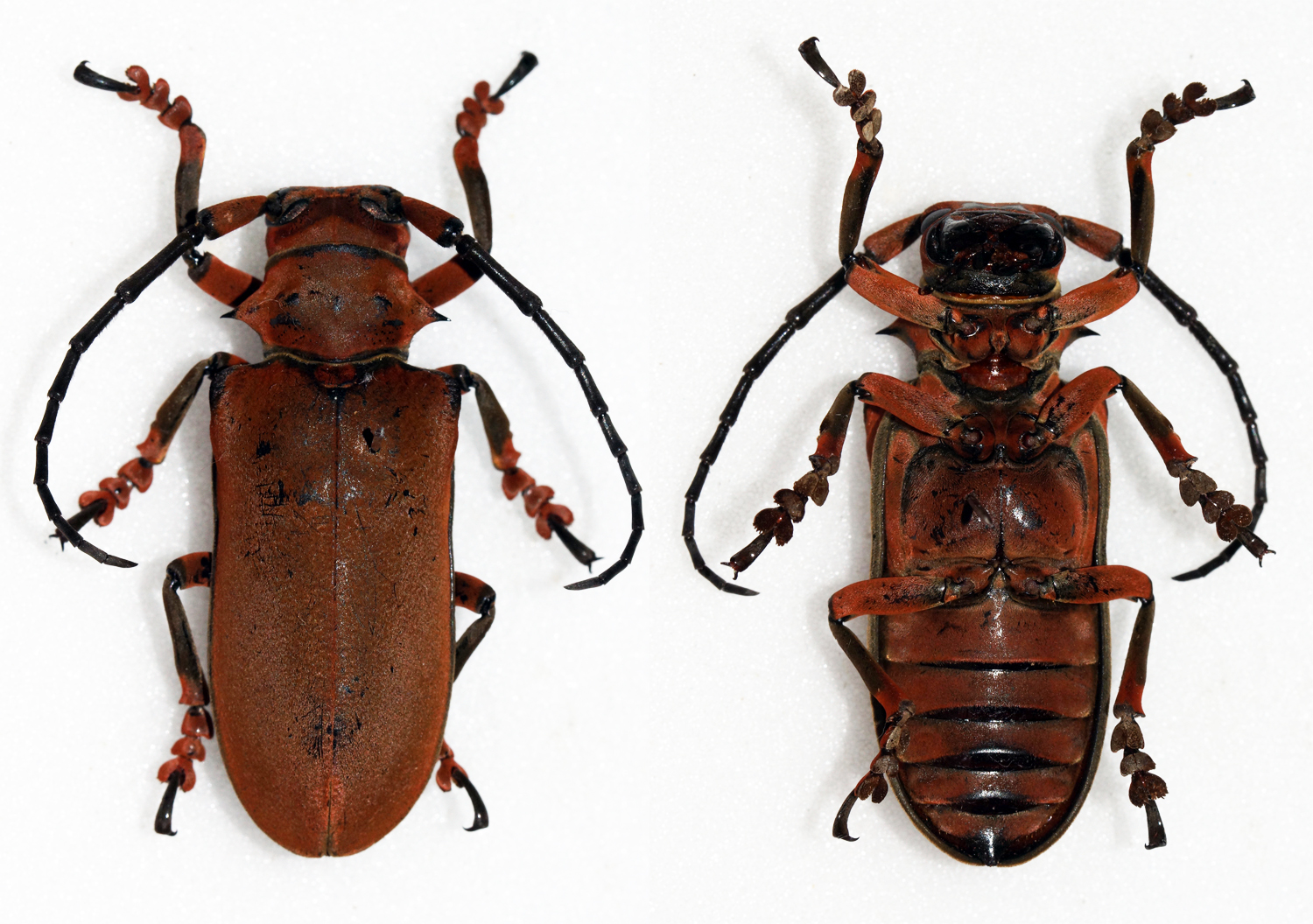

Scientific classification
- Kingdom: Animalia
- Phylum: Arthropoda
- Class: Insecta
- Order: Coleoptera
- Suborder: Polyphaga
- Infraorder: Cucujiformia
- Family: Cerambycidae
- Genus: Ioesse
- Species: I. sanguinolenta

Binomial name
- Ioesse sanguinolenta Thomson, 1864

Synonyms
- Joesse sanguinolenta (Thomson) Gemminger & Harold, 1873

= Ioesse sanguinolenta =

Species of beetle

Ioesse sanguinolenta is a species of beetle in the family Cerambycidae. It was described by James Thomson in 1864. It is known from Malaysia.
