= Capitocrassus =

Scientific classification
- Kingdom: Animalia
- Phylum: Arthropoda
- Class: Insecta
- Order: Coleoptera
- Suborder: Polyphaga
- Infraorder: Cucujiformia
- Family: Cerambycidae
- Tribe: Petrognathini
- Genus: Capitocrassus
- Species: C. castaneus

Binomial name
- Capitocrassus castaneus Van Eecke, 1921

Genus of beetles

Capitocrassus castaneus is a species of beetle in the family Cerambycidae, and the only species in the genus Capitocrassus. It was described by Van Eecke in 1921.
