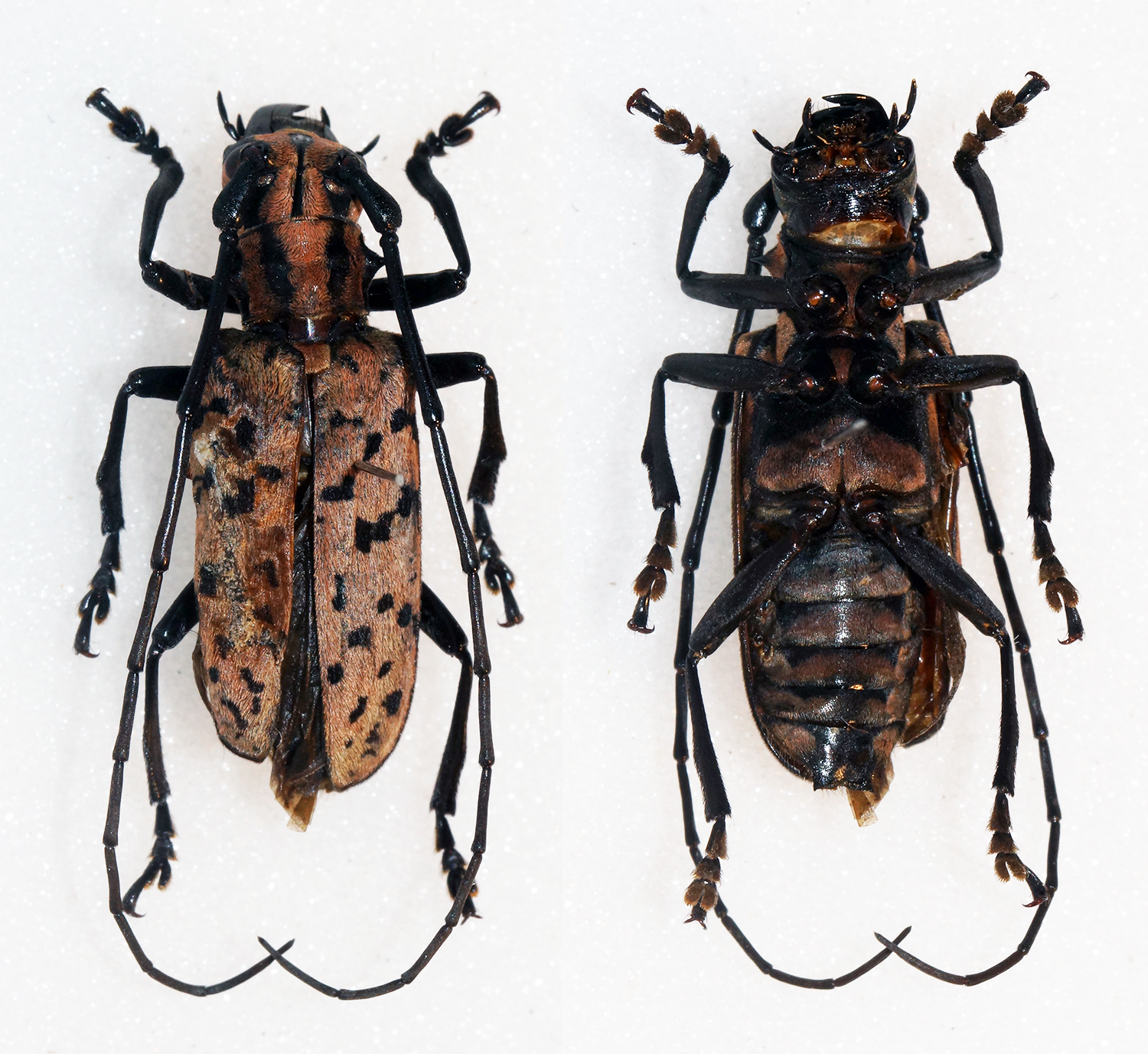

Scientific classification
- Kingdom: Animalia
- Phylum: Arthropoda
- Class: Insecta
- Order: Coleoptera
- Suborder: Polyphaga
- Infraorder: Cucujiformia
- Family: Cerambycidae
- Genus: Ithocritus
- Species: I. multimaculatus

Binomial name
- Ithocritus multimaculatus Pic, 1934

Synonyms
- Inthocritus fascicollis Breuning, 1935

= Ithocritus multimaculatus =

Species of beetle

Ithocritus multimaculatus is a species of beetle in the family Cerambycidae. It was described by Maurice Pic in 1934. It is known from Vietnam.
