= Ithocritus ruber =

Scientific classification
- Kingdom: Animalia
- Phylum: Arthropoda
- Class: Insecta
- Order: Coleoptera
- Suborder: Polyphaga
- Infraorder: Cucujiformia
- Family: Cerambycidae
- Genus: Ithocritus
- Species: I. ruber

Binomial name
- Ithocritus ruber (Hope, 1839)

Synonyms
- Monohammus ruber Hope, 1939

Species of beetle

Ithocritus ruber is a species of beetle in the family Cerambycidae. It was described by Frederick William Hope in 1839. It is known from India, Bangladesh, and Vietnam.
