= Ioesse putaoensis =

Scientific classification
- Kingdom: Animalia
- Phylum: Arthropoda
- Class: Insecta
- Order: Coleoptera
- Suborder: Polyphaga
- Infraorder: Cucujiformia
- Family: Cerambycidae
- Genus: Ioesse
- Species: I. putaoensis

Binomial name
- Ioesse putaoensis Ohbayashi & Lin, 2012

Species of beetle

Ioesse putaoensis is a species of beetle in the family Cerambycidae. It was described by Ohbayashi and Lin in 2012. It is known from Myanmar.
