= Ioesse rubra =

Scientific classification
- Kingdom: Animalia
- Phylum: Arthropoda
- Class: Insecta
- Order: Coleoptera
- Suborder: Polyphaga
- Infraorder: Cucujiformia
- Family: Cerambycidae
- Genus: Ioesse
- Species: I. rubra

Binomial name
- Ioesse rubra (Pic, 1925)

Synonyms
- Macrocelosterna rubra Pic, 1925

Species of beetle

Ioesse rubra is a species of beetle in the family Cerambycidae. It was described by Maurice Pic in 1925, originally under the genus Macrocelosterna. It is known from Thailand, Myanmar, China, Laos, and Vietnam.
