= Falsimalmus =

Scientific classification
- Kingdom: Animalia
- Phylum: Arthropoda
- Class: Insecta
- Order: Coleoptera
- Suborder: Polyphaga
- Infraorder: Cucujiformia
- Family: Cerambycidae
- Tribe: Petrognathini
- Genus: Falsimalmus
- Species: F. niger

Binomial name
- Falsimalmus niger Breuning, 1956

Genus of beetles

Falsimalmus niger is a species of beetle in the family Cerambycidae, and the only species in the genus Falsimalmus. It was described by Stephan von Breuning in 1956.
