= Pseudapriona =

Scientific classification
- Kingdom: Animalia
- Phylum: Arthropoda
- Class: Insecta
- Order: Coleoptera
- Suborder: Polyphaga
- Infraorder: Cucujiformia
- Family: Cerambycidae
- Tribe: Petrognathini
- Genus: Pseudapriona
- Species: P. flavoantennata

Binomial name
- Pseudapriona flavoantennata Breuning, 1936

Genus of beetles

Pseudapriona flavoantennata is a species of beetle in the family Cerambycidae, and the only species in the genus Pseudapriona. It was described by Stephan von Breuning in 1936.
