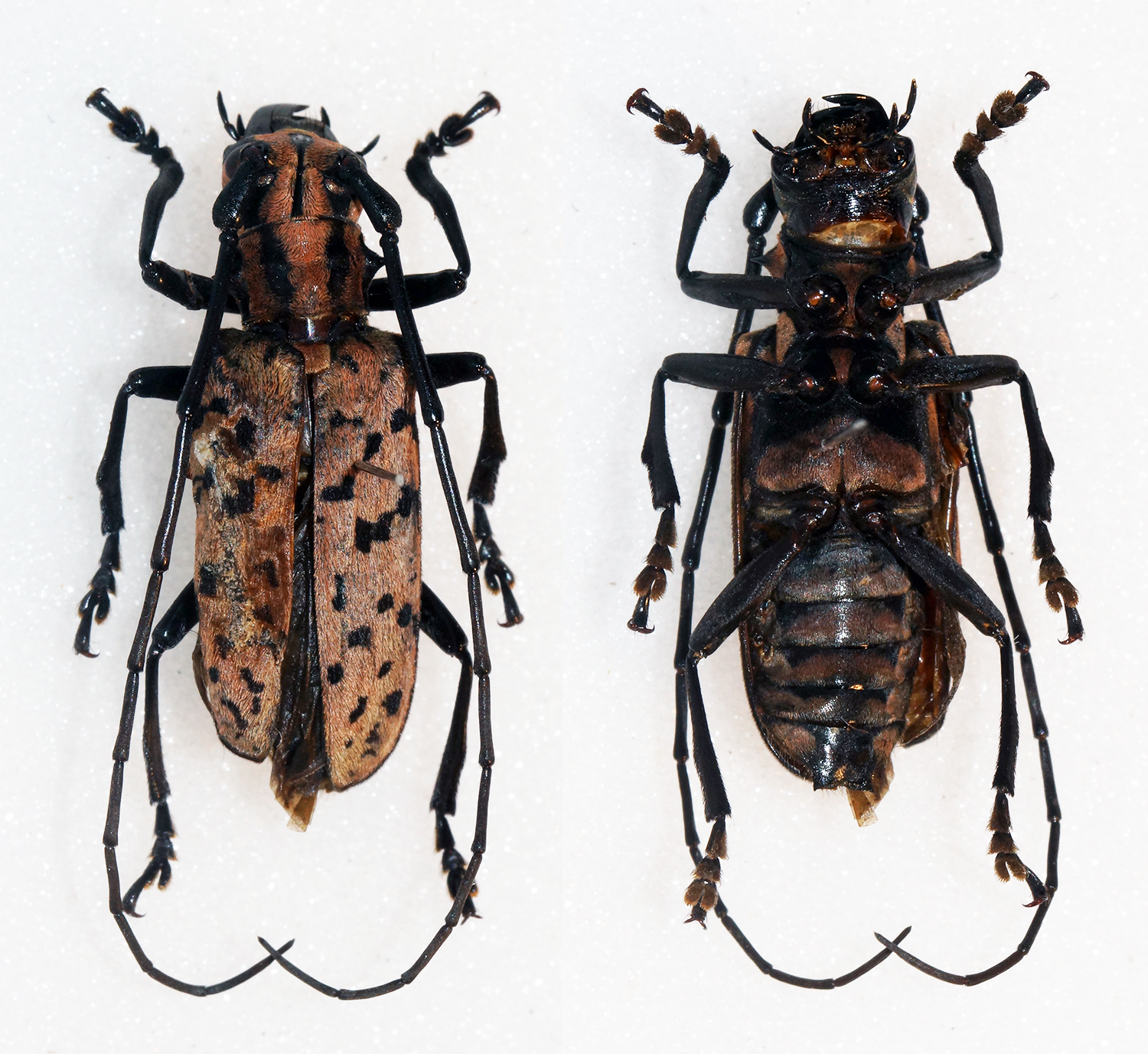
- Ithocritus multimaculatus

Scientific classification
- Kingdom: Animalia
- Phylum: Arthropoda
- Class: Insecta
- Order: Coleoptera
- Suborder: Polyphaga
- Infraorder: Cucujiformia
- Family: Cerambycidae
- Tribe: Petrognathini
- Genus: Ithocritus

= Ithocritus =

Genus of beetles

Ithocritus is a genus of longhorn beetles of the subfamily Lamiinae, containing the following species:

- Ithocritus multimaculatus Pic, 1934
- Ithocritus ruber (Hope, 1839)
