= Lentalius =

Scientific classification
- Kingdom: Animalia
- Phylum: Arthropoda
- Class: Insecta
- Order: Coleoptera
- Suborder: Polyphaga
- Infraorder: Cucujiformia
- Family: Cerambycidae
- Genus: Lentalius
- Species: L. dorsopictus

Binomial name
- Lentalius dorsopictus (Fairmaire, 1902)

Genus of beetles

Lentalius dorsopictus is a species of beetle in the family Cerambycidae, and the only species in the genus Lentalius. It was described by Fairmaire in 1902.
