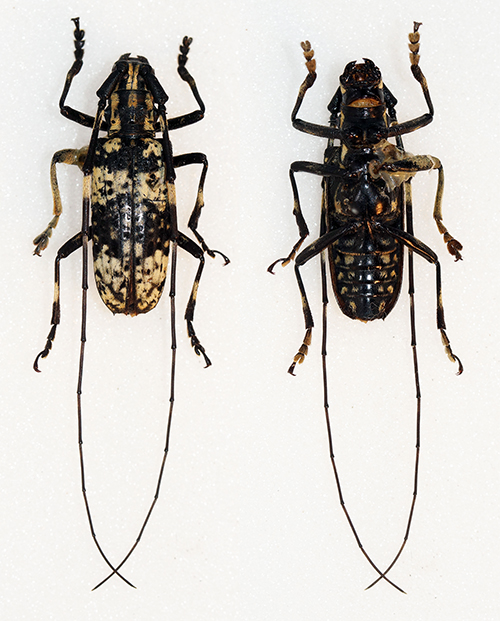
- Lockhartia imbricata beetles

Scientific classification
- Domain: Eukaryota
- Kingdom: Animalia
- Phylum: Arthropoda
- Class: Insecta
- Order: Coleoptera
- Suborder: Polyphaga
- Infraorder: Cucujiformia
- Family: Cerambycidae
- Genus: Paraepepeotes
- Species: P. westwoodii

Binomial name
- Paraepepeotes westwoodii (Westwood, 1848)

Synonyms
- Hammaticherus westwoodii Westwood, 1848; Parepepeotes westwoodi Breuning, 1943 (Lapsus calami)

= Paraepepeotes westwoodii =

Species of beetle

Paraepepeotes westwoodii is a species of beetle in the family Cerambycidae. It was described by John O. Westwood in 1848, originally under the genus Hammaticherus. It is known from India.
