= Paraepepeotes guttatus =

Scientific classification
- Domain: Eukaryota
- Kingdom: Animalia
- Phylum: Arthropoda
- Class: Insecta
- Order: Coleoptera
- Suborder: Polyphaga
- Infraorder: Cucujiformia
- Family: Cerambycidae
- Genus: Paraepepeotes
- Species: P. guttatus

Binomial name
- Paraepepeotes guttatus (Guérin-Méneville, 1844)

Synonyms
- Monohammus guttatus Guérin-Méneville, 1844; Monohammus punctulatus Westwood, 1848

Species of beetle

Paraepepeotes guttatus is a species of beetle in the family Cerambycidae. It was described by Félix Édouard Guérin-Méneville in 1844, originally under the genus Monohammus. It is known from India, China, Myanmar, and Nepal.

Paraepepeotes guttatus measure 15–28 mm (0.59–1.10 in) in length.
