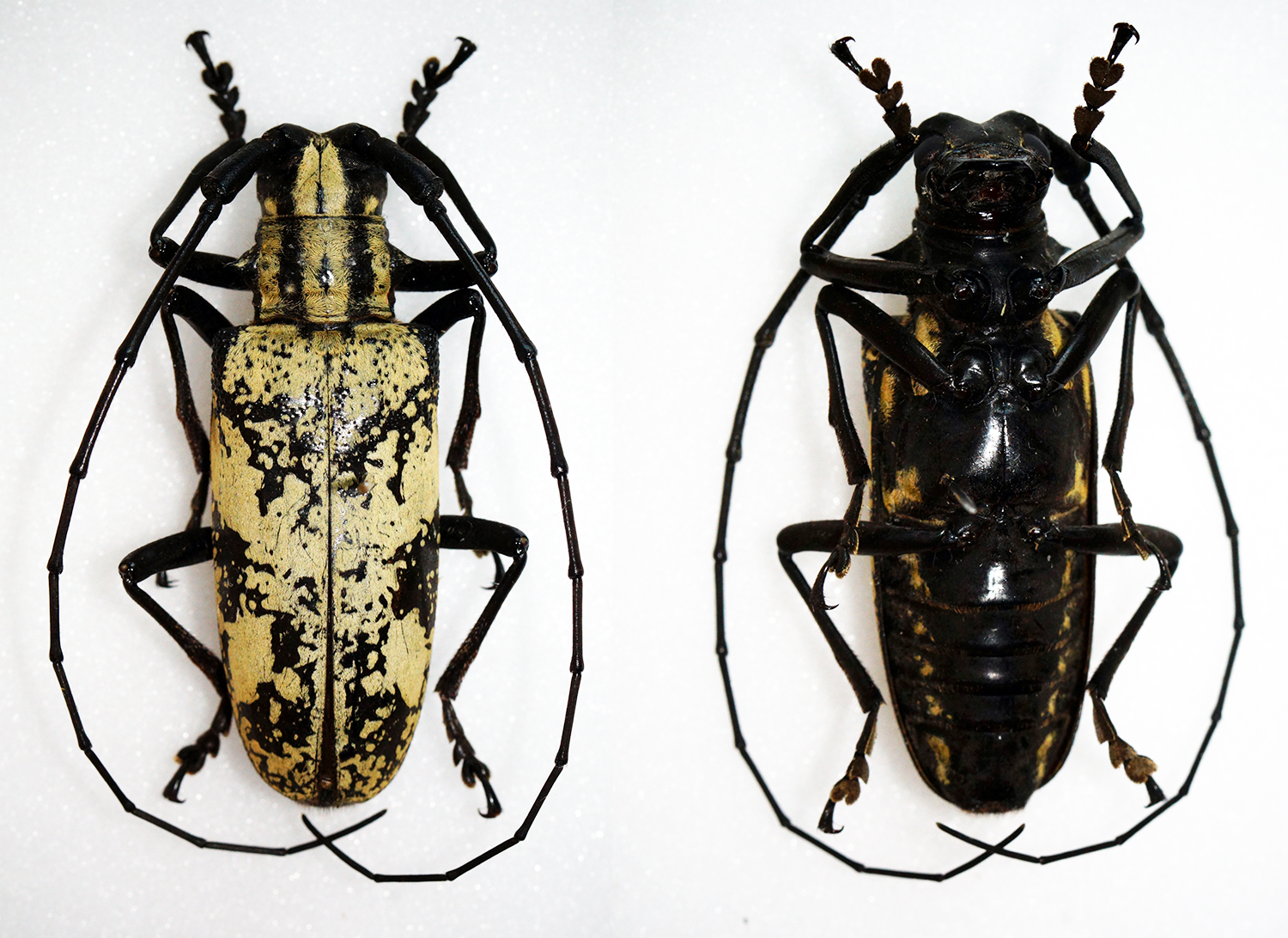

Scientific classification
- Kingdom: Animalia
- Phylum: Arthropoda
- Class: Insecta
- Order: Coleoptera
- Suborder: Polyphaga
- Infraorder: Cucujiformia
- Family: Cerambycidae
- Genus: Paraepepeotes
- Species: P. marmoratus

Binomial name
- Paraepepeotes marmoratus (Pic, 1925)

Synonyms
- Monochamus marmoratus Pic, 1925

= Paraepepeotes marmoratus =

Species of beetle

Paraepepeotes marmoratus is a species of beetle in the family Cerambycidae. It was described by Maurice Pic in 1925. It is known from Vietnam and Laos.
