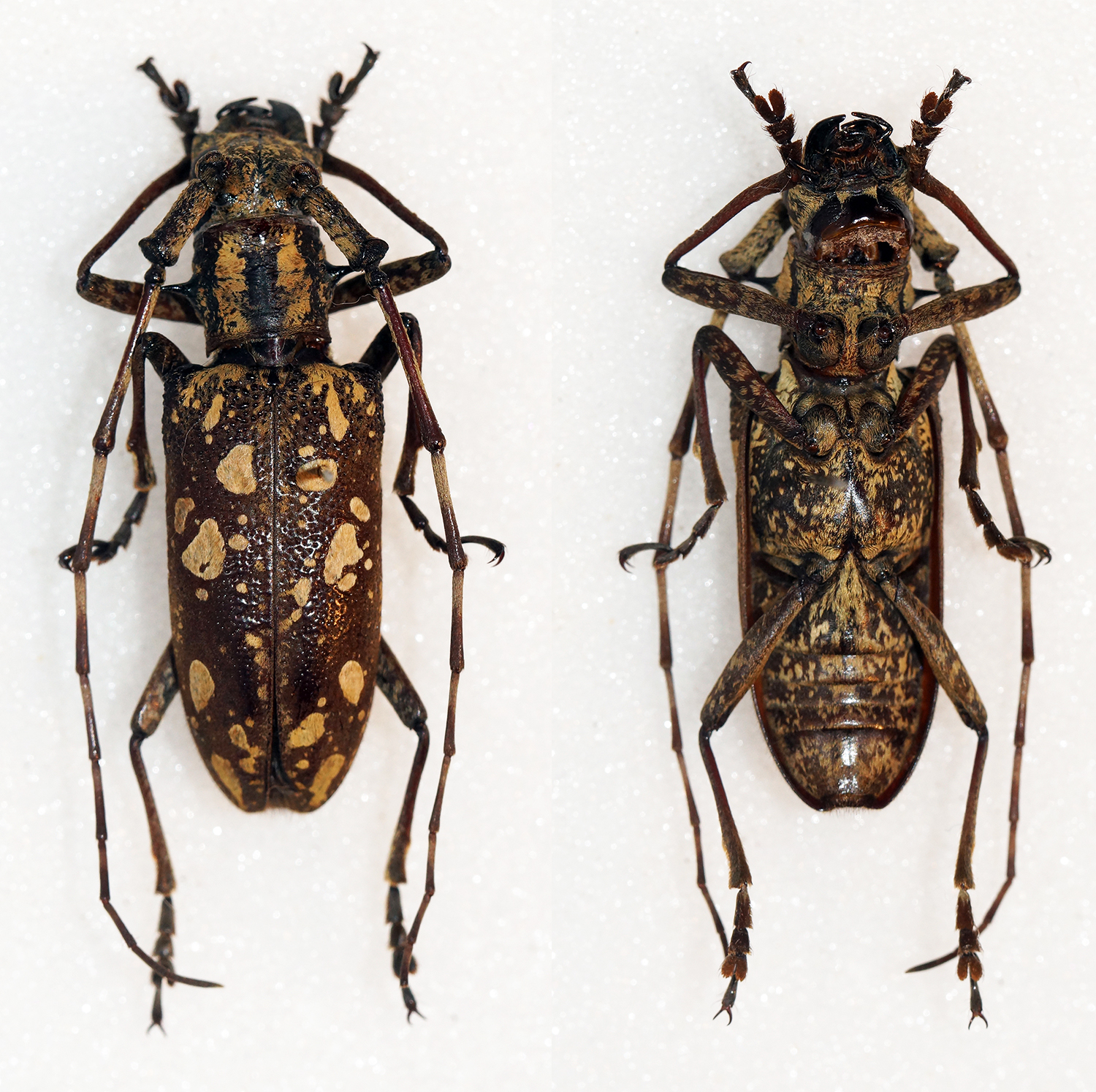

Scientific classification
- Kingdom: Animalia
- Phylum: Arthropoda
- Class: Insecta
- Order: Coleoptera
- Suborder: Polyphaga
- Infraorder: Cucujiformia
- Family: Cerambycidae
- Genus: Paraepepeotes
- Species: P. breuningi

Binomial name
- Paraepepeotes breuningi (Pic, 1935)

Synonyms
- Monochamus breuningi Pic, 1935

= Paraepepeotes breuningi =

Species of beetle

Paraepepeotes breuningi is a species of beetle in the family Cerambycidae. It was described by Maurice Pic in 1935. It is known from India.
