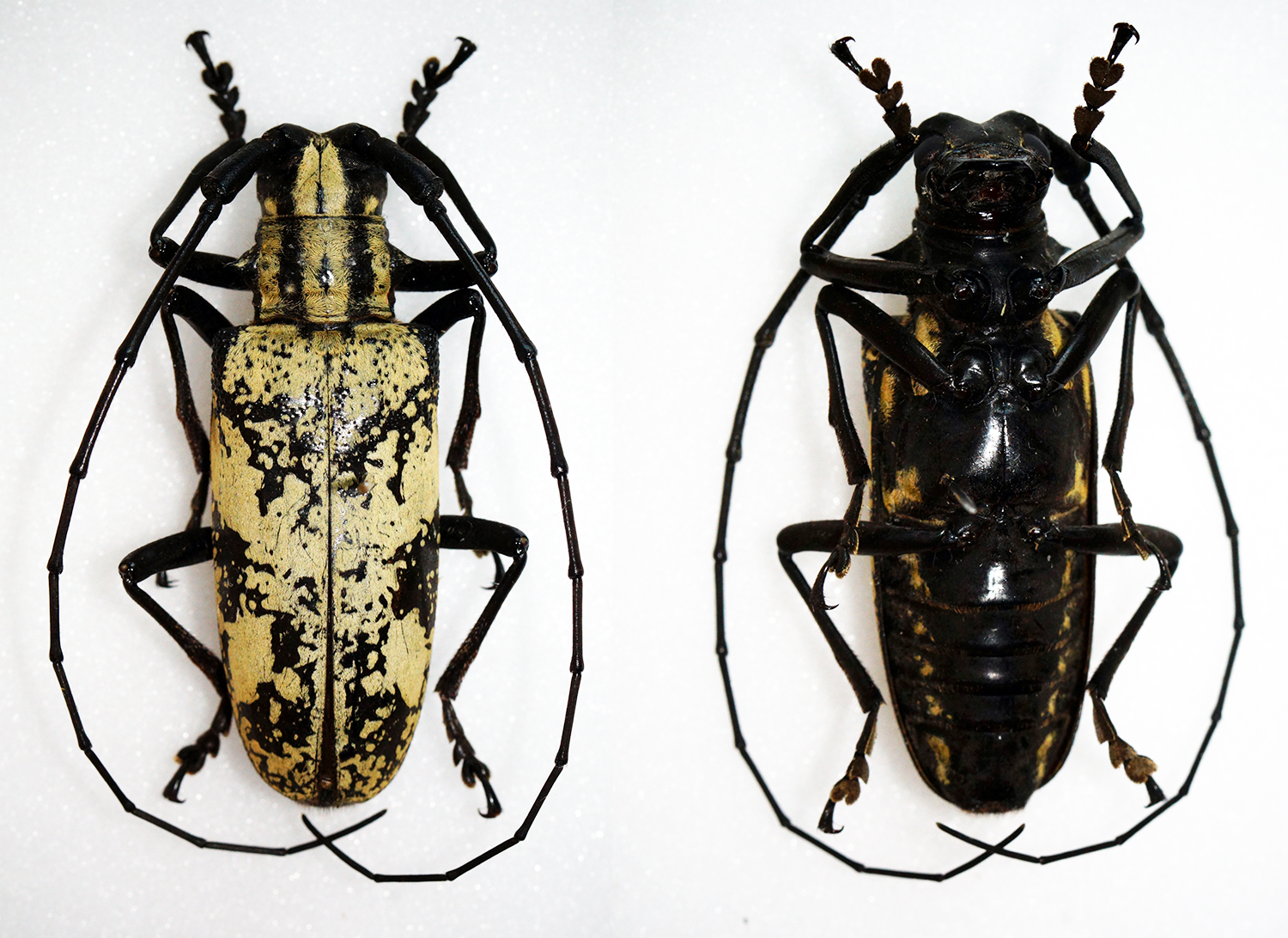
- Paraepepeotes marmoratus female

Scientific classification
- Kingdom: Animalia
- Phylum: Arthropoda
- Class: Insecta
- Order: Coleoptera
- Suborder: Polyphaga
- Infraorder: Cucujiformia
- Family: Cerambycidae
- Subfamily: Lamiinae
- Genus: Paraepepeotes; Pic, 1935

Species
- See text.

Synonyms
- Parepepeotes Bruening, 1938 (lapsus calami)

= Paraepepeotes =

Genus of beetles

Paraepepeotes is a genus of longhorn beetles of the subfamily Lamiinae, containing the following species:

- Paraepepeotes affinis Breuning, 1938
- Paraepepeotes albomaculatus (Gahan, 1888)
- Paraepepeotes breuningi (Pic, 1935)
- Paraepepeotes gigas (Aurivillius, 1897)
- Paraepepeotes guttatus (Guérin-Ménéville, 1844)
- Paraepepeotes isabellinoides Breuning, 1960
- Paraepepeotes marmoratus (Pic, 1925)
- Paraepepeotes szetschuanicus Breuning, 1969
- Paraepepeotes togatus (Perroud, 1855)
- Paraepepeotes websteri (Jordan, 1898)
- Paraepepeotes westwoodii (Westwood, 1848)
