= Paraepepeotes websteri =

Scientific classification
- Domain: Eukaryota
- Kingdom: Animalia
- Phylum: Arthropoda
- Class: Insecta
- Order: Coleoptera
- Suborder: Polyphaga
- Infraorder: Cucujiformia
- Family: Cerambycidae
- Genus: Paraepepeotes
- Species: P. websteri

Binomial name
- Paraepepeotes websteri (Jordan, 1898)

Synonyms
- Epepeotes websteri Jordan, 1898

Species of beetle

Paraepepeotes websteri is a species of beetle in the family Cerambycidae. It was described by Karl Jordan in 1898.
