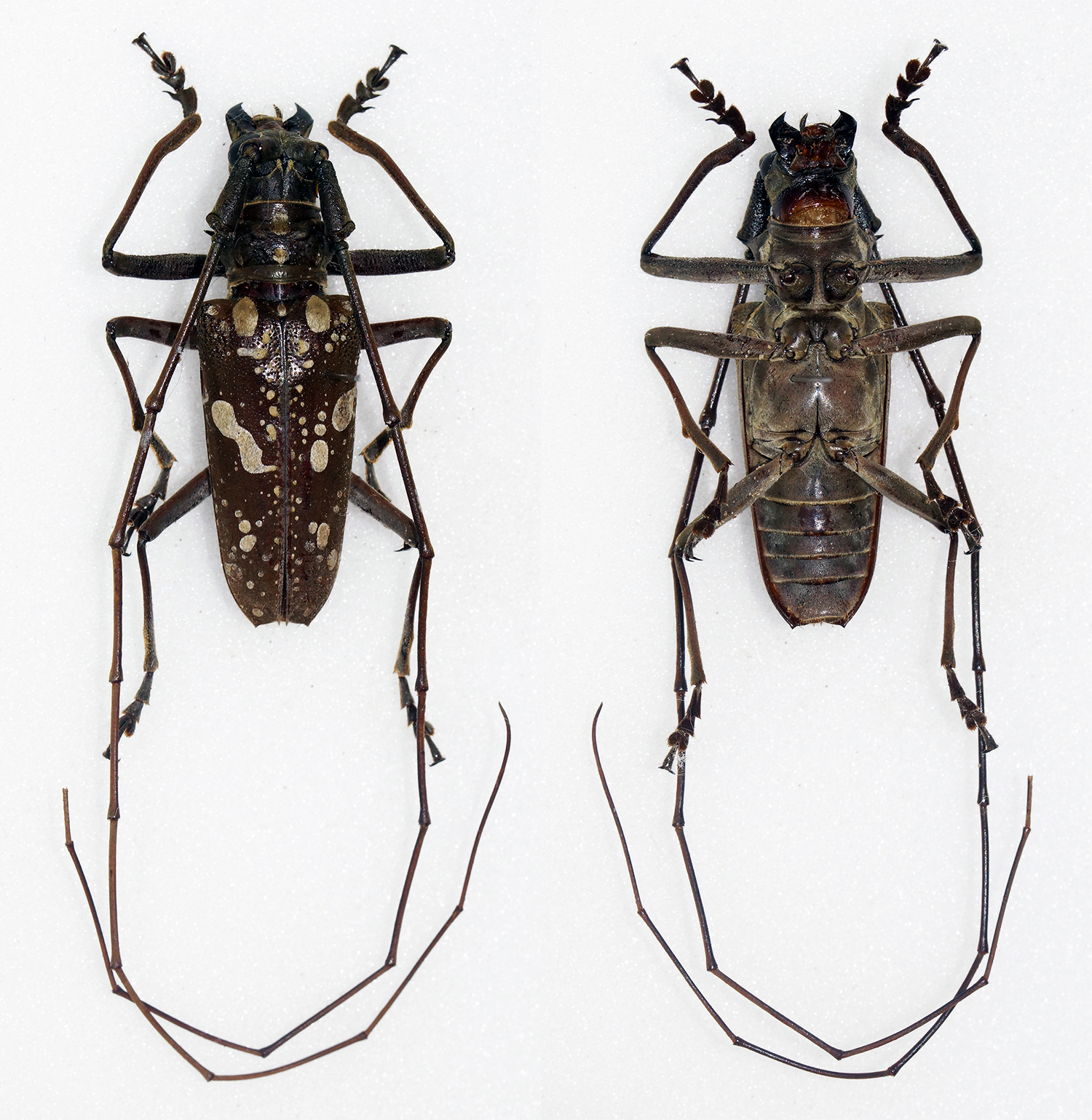

Scientific classification
- Kingdom: Animalia
- Phylum: Arthropoda
- Class: Insecta
- Order: Coleoptera
- Suborder: Polyphaga
- Infraorder: Cucujiformia
- Family: Cerambycidae
- Genus: Paraepepeotes
- Species: P. gigas

Binomial name
- Paraepepeotes gigas (Aurivillius, 1897)

Synonyms
- Epepeotes gigas Aurivillius, 1897

= Paraepepeotes gigas =

Species of beetle

Paraepepeotes gigas is a species of beetle in the family Cerambycidae. It was described by Per Olof Christopher Aurivillius in 1897. It is known from Borneo and Malaysia.
