= Paraepepeotes albomaculatus =

Scientific classification
- Domain: Eukaryota
- Kingdom: Animalia
- Phylum: Arthropoda
- Class: Insecta
- Order: Coleoptera
- Suborder: Polyphaga
- Infraorder: Cucujiformia
- Family: Cerambycidae
- Genus: Paraepepeotes
- Species: P. albomaculatus

Binomial name
- Paraepepeotes albomaculatus (Gahan, 1888)

Synonyms
- Epepeotes albomaculatus Gahan, 1888

Species of beetle

Paraepepeotes albomaculatus is a species of beetle in the family Cerambycidae. It was described by Charles Joseph Gahan in 1888. It is known from India, Bhutan, and Myanmar.
