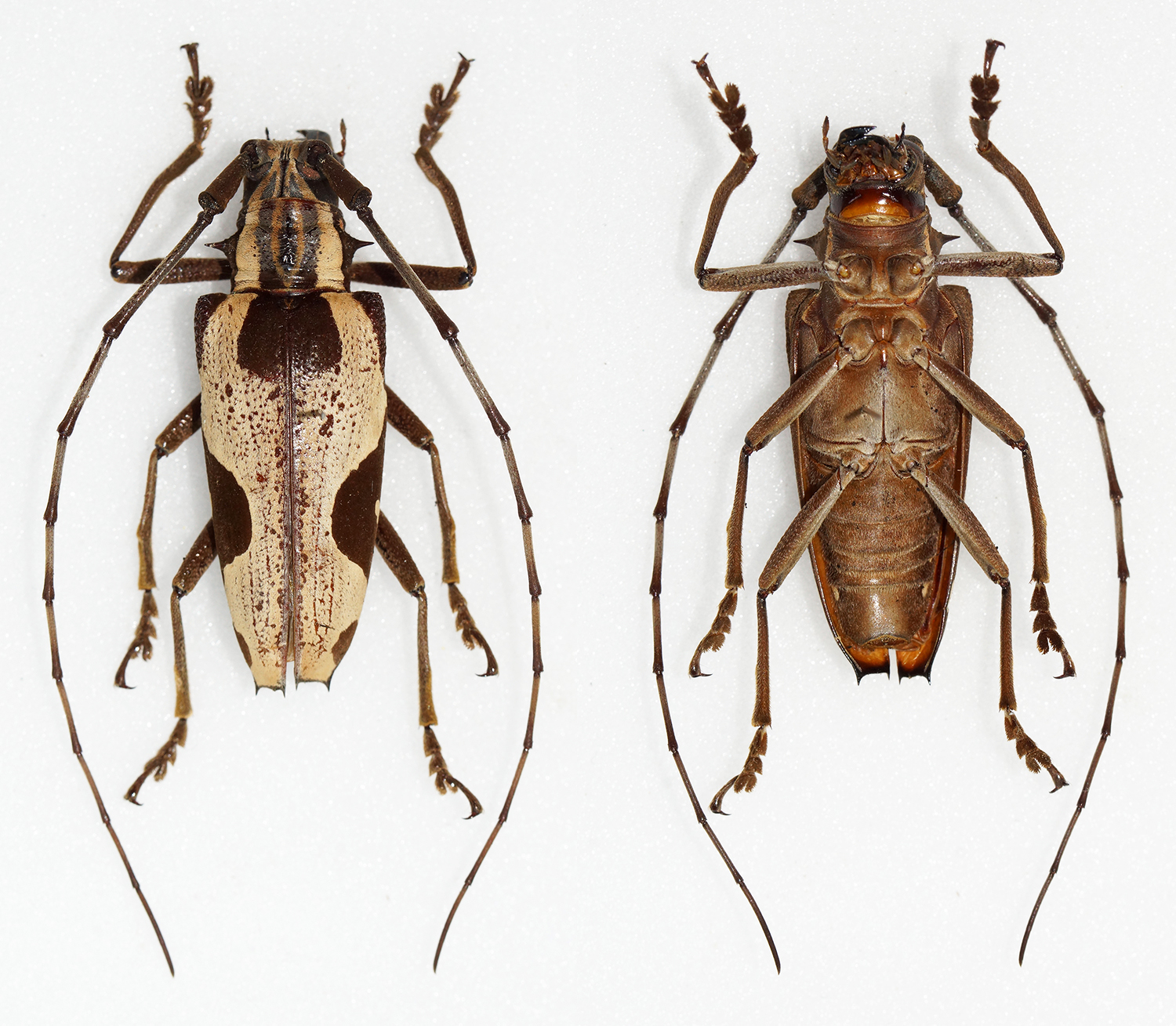

Scientific classification
- Kingdom: Animalia
- Phylum: Arthropoda
- Class: Insecta
- Order: Coleoptera
- Suborder: Polyphaga
- Infraorder: Cucujiformia
- Family: Cerambycidae
- Genus: Paraepepeotes
- Species: P. togatus

Binomial name
- Paraepepeotes togatus (Perroud, 1855)

Synonyms
- Dihammus rarus (Thomson) Pascoe, 1866; Dihammus togatus (Perroud) Aurivillius, 1922; Diochares eugenius Heller, 1897; Epepeotes rarus (Thomson) Actorum; Monohammus rarus Thomson, 1857; Monohammus togatus Perroud, 1855

= Paraepepeotes togatus =

Species of beetle

Paraepepeotes togatus is a species of beetle in the family Cerambycidae. It was described by Perroud in 1855, originally under the genus Monohammus. It is known from Papua New Guinea, Australia, and Moluccas.

== Subspecies ==
- Paraepepeotes togatus dilaceratus Breuning, 1943
- Paraepepeotes togatus rossellii Breuning, 1970
- Paraepepeotes togatus togatus (Perroud, 1855)
