= Paraepepeotes isabellinoides =

Scientific classification
- Kingdom: Animalia
- Phylum: Arthropoda
- Class: Insecta
- Order: Coleoptera
- Suborder: Polyphaga
- Infraorder: Cucujiformia
- Family: Cerambycidae
- Genus: Paraepepeotes
- Species: P. isabellinoides

Binomial name
- Paraepepeotes isabellinoides Breuning, 1960

Species of beetle

Paraepepeotes isabellinoides is a species of beetle in the family Cerambycidae. It was described by Stephan von Breuning in 1960.
