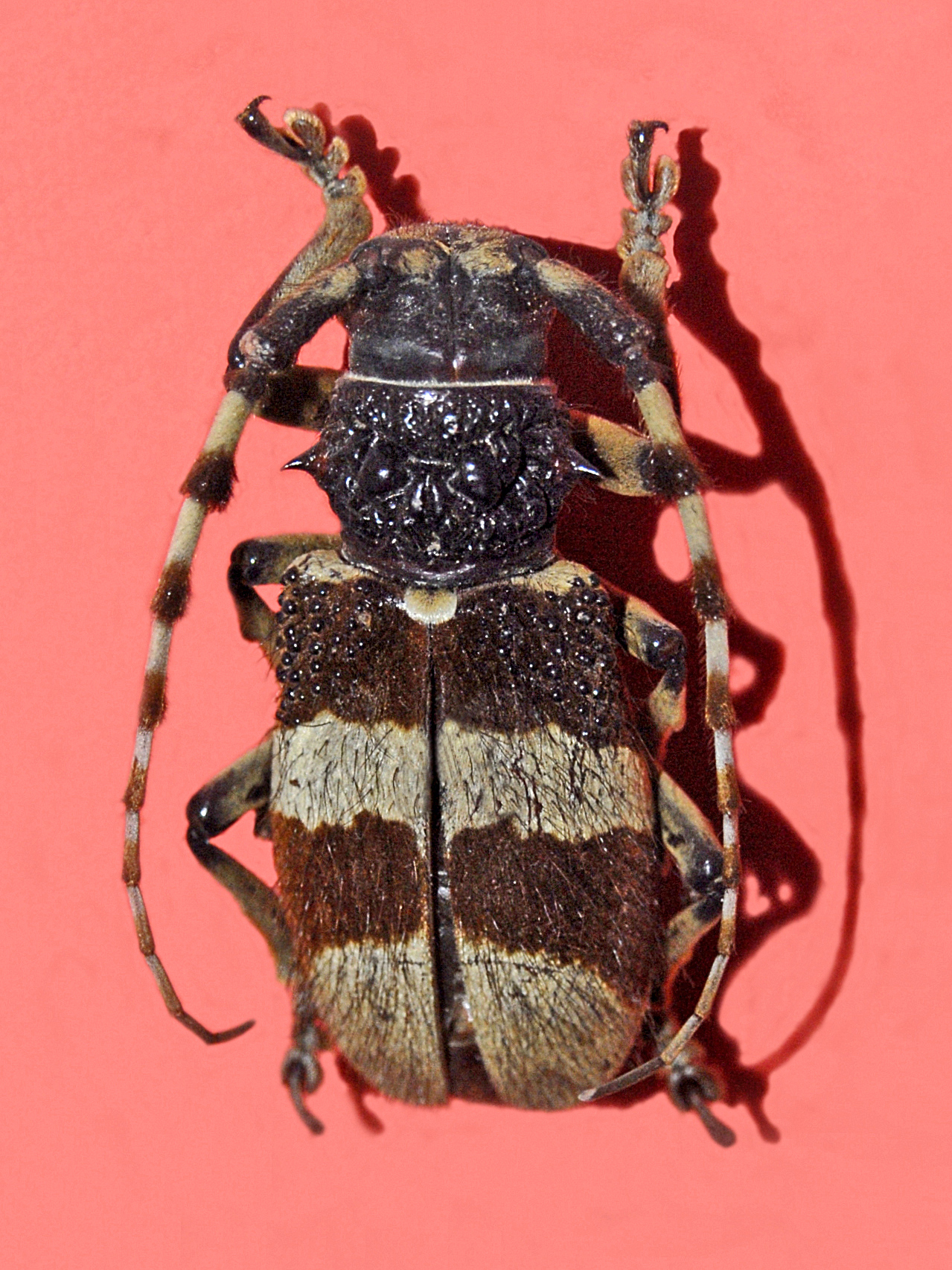
- Museum specimen of Arctolamia fasciata

Scientific classification
- Kingdom: Animalia
- Phylum: Arthropoda
- Class: Insecta
- Order: Coleoptera
- Suborder: Polyphaga
- Infraorder: Cucujiformia
- Family: Cerambycidae
- Genus: Arctolamia
- Species: A. fasciata

Binomial name
- Arctolamia fasciata Gestro, 1890

Synonyms
- Arctolamia fruhstorferi laosica Breuning, 1965

= Arctolamia fasciata =

Species of beetle

Arctolamia fasciata is a species of flat-faced longhorn beetles belonging to the family Cerambycidae.

== Description ==
Arctolamia fasciata can reach a length of about 31 millimetres (1.2 in) and a body width of about 11 millimetres (0.43 in). Body is almost rectangular and elytra have two wide dark brown transverse bands on a greyish background. Pronotum is black, with many irregular wrinkle and sharp spines. Elytra and legs are densely hairy. In males antennae are longer than the body. Antennal segments show black or brown long tufts.

== Distribution ==
This species is present in China, Laos, Malaysia, Myanmar, Thailand and Vietnam.
