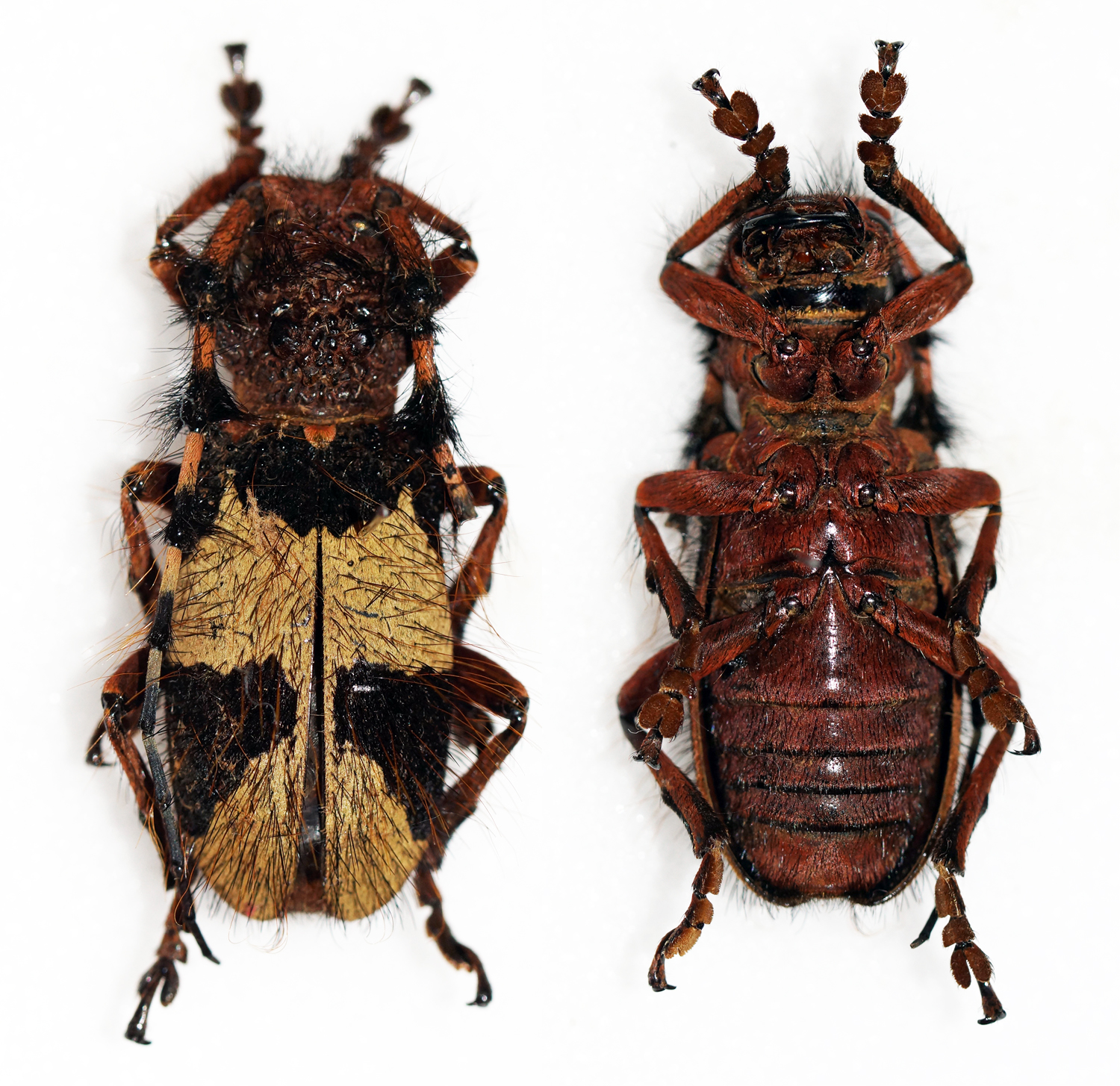

Scientific classification
- Domain: Eukaryota
- Kingdom: Animalia
- Phylum: Arthropoda
- Class: Insecta
- Order: Coleoptera
- Suborder: Polyphaga
- Infraorder: Cucujiformia
- Family: Cerambycidae
- Tribe: Lamiini
- Genus: Arctolamia
- Species: A. fruhstorferi

Binomial name
- Arctolamia fruhstorferi Aurivillius, 1902

Synonyms
- Arctolamia margaretae Gilmour, 1950

= Arctolamia fruhstorferi =

Species of beetle

Arctolamia fruhstorferi is a species of beetle in the family Cerambycidae. It was described by Per Olof Christopher Aurivillius in 1902. It is known from Vietnam, China and Laos.
