= Arctolamia villosa =

Scientific classification
- Domain: Eukaryota
- Kingdom: Animalia
- Phylum: Arthropoda
- Class: Insecta
- Order: Coleoptera
- Suborder: Polyphaga
- Infraorder: Cucujiformia
- Family: Cerambycidae
- Tribe: Lamiini
- Genus: Arctolamia
- Species: A. villosa

Binomial name
- Arctolamia villosa Gestro, 1888

Species of beetle

Arctolamia villosa is a species of beetle in the family Cerambycidae. It was described by Gestro in 1888. It is known from Myanmar, China, and Thailand.
