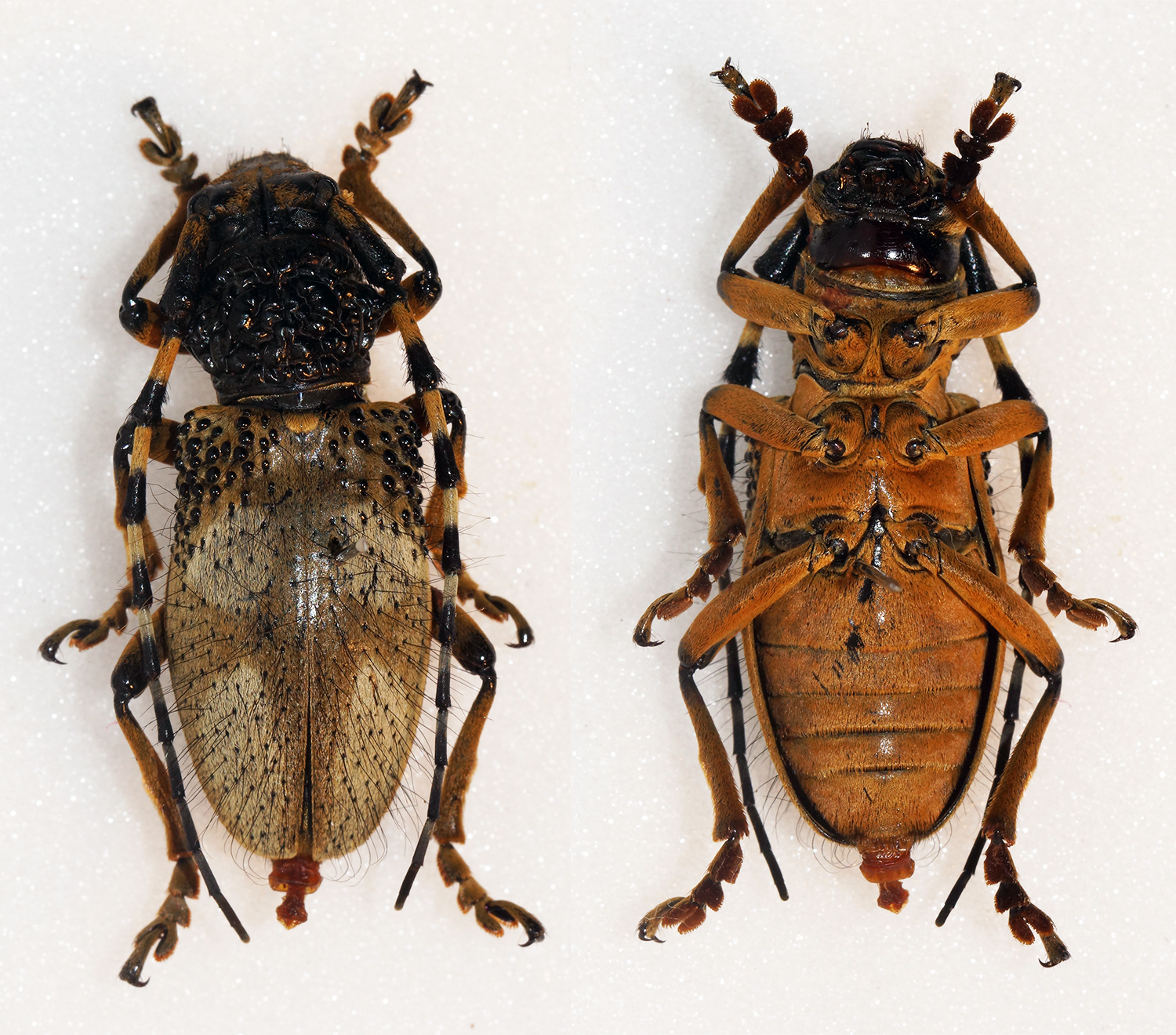

Scientific classification
- Domain: Eukaryota
- Kingdom: Animalia
- Phylum: Arthropoda
- Class: Insecta
- Order: Coleoptera
- Suborder: Polyphaga
- Infraorder: Cucujiformia
- Family: Cerambycidae
- Tribe: Lamiini
- Genus: Arctolamia
- Species: A. luteomaculata

Binomial name
- Arctolamia luteomaculata Pu, 1981

Synonyms
- Arctolamia alcinoides Wang, 2014; Arctolamia cruciata Hüdepohl, 1990

= Arctolamia luteomaculata =

Species of beetle

Arctolamia luteomaculata is a species of beetle in the family Cerambycidae. It was described by Pu in 1981. It is known from China and Thailand.
