= Arctolamia strandi =

Scientific classification
- Kingdom: Animalia
- Phylum: Arthropoda
- Class: Insecta
- Order: Coleoptera
- Suborder: Polyphaga
- Infraorder: Cucujiformia
- Family: Cerambycidae
- Genus: Arctolamia
- Species: A. strandi

Binomial name
- Arctolamia strandi Breuning, 1936

Synonyms
- Arctolamia strandi m. postimmaculata Breuning, 1965

Species of beetle

Arctolamia strandi is a species of beetle in the family Cerambycidae. It was described by Stephan von Breuning in 1936. It is known from China.
