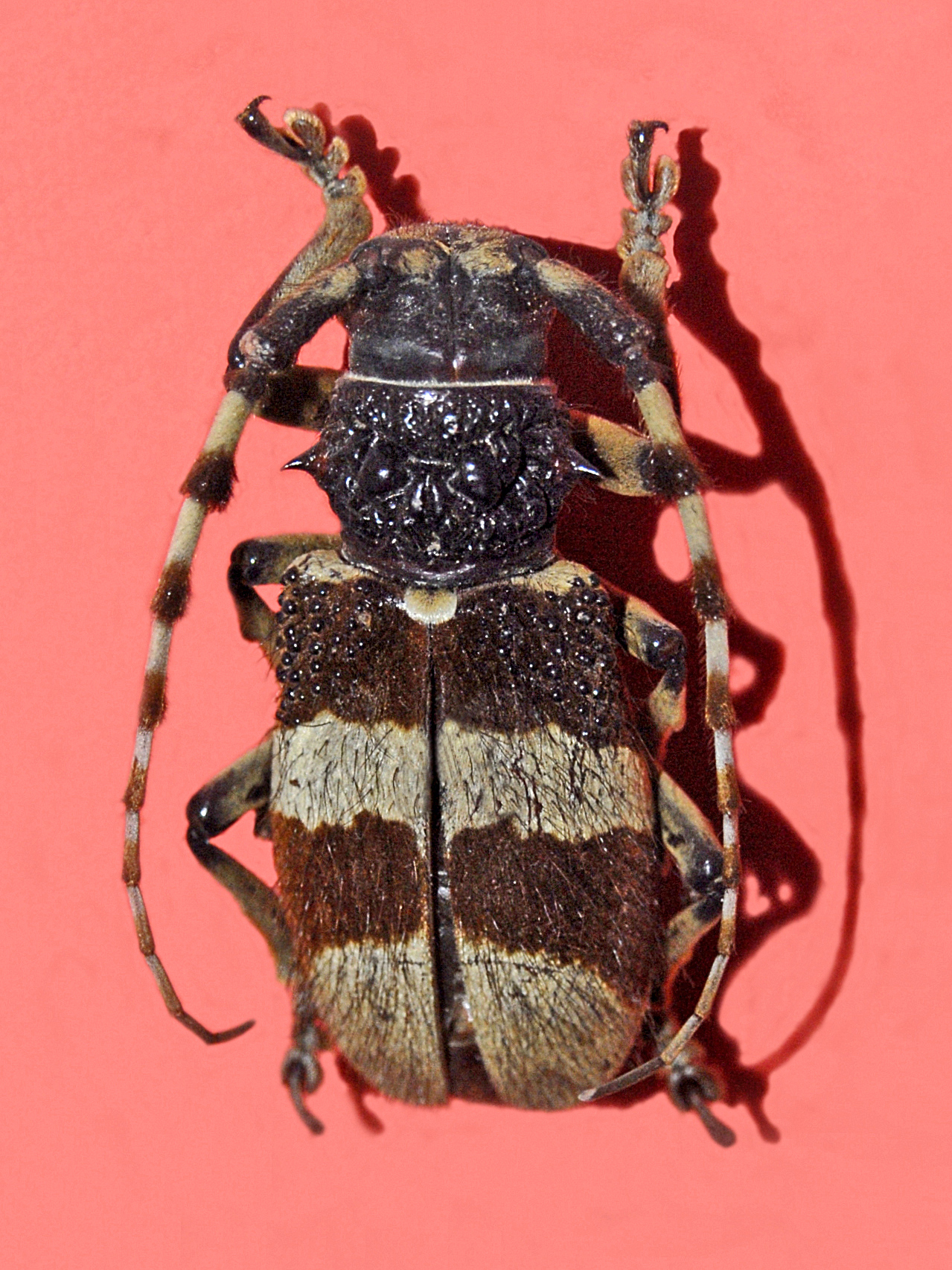
- Museum specimen of Arctolamia fasciata

Scientific classification
- Domain: Eukaryota
- Kingdom: Animalia
- Phylum: Arthropoda
- Class: Insecta
- Order: Coleoptera
- Suborder: Polyphaga
- Infraorder: Cucujiformia
- Family: Cerambycidae
- Subfamily: Lamiinae
- Tribe: Lamiini
- Genus: Arctolamia; Gestro, 1888

= Arctolamia =

Genus of beetles

Arctolamia is a genus of flat-faced longhorn beetles belonging to the family Cerambycidae.

== Species ==
- Arctolamia fasciata Gestro, 1890
- Arctolamia fruhstorferi Aurivillius, 1902
- Arctolamia luteomaculata Pu, 1981
- Arctolamia strandi Breuning, 1936
- Arctolamia villosa Gestro, 1888
