= Macrochenus lacordairei =

Scientific classification
- Kingdom: Animalia
- Phylum: Arthropoda
- Clade: Pancrustacea
- Class: Insecta
- Order: Coleoptera
- Suborder: Polyphaga
- Infraorder: Cucujiformia
- Family: Cerambycidae
- Genus: Macrochenus
- Species: M. lacordairei

Binomial name
- Macrochenus lacordairei (Thomson, 1865)

Synonyms
- Mecotagus poecilus Pascoe, 1866; Pelargoderus lacordairei Thomson, 1865

Species of beetle

Macrochenus lacordairei is a species of beetle in the family Cerambycidae. It was described by James Thomson in 1865, originally under the genus Pelargoderus. It is known from Java.
