= Macrochenus guerini =

Scientific classification
- Domain: Eukaryota
- Kingdom: Animalia
- Phylum: Arthropoda
- Class: Insecta
- Order: Coleoptera
- Suborder: Polyphaga
- Infraorder: Cucujiformia
- Family: Cerambycidae
- Genus: Macrochenus
- Species: M. guerini

Binomial name
- Macrochenus guerini (White, 1858)

Synonyms
- Pelargoderus guerinii White, 1858; Macrochenus guerini (White, 1858) (misspelling)

Species of beetle

Macrochenus guerini is a species of beetle in the family Cerambycidae. It was described by White in 1858. It is known from India, Nepal and Bangladesh.
