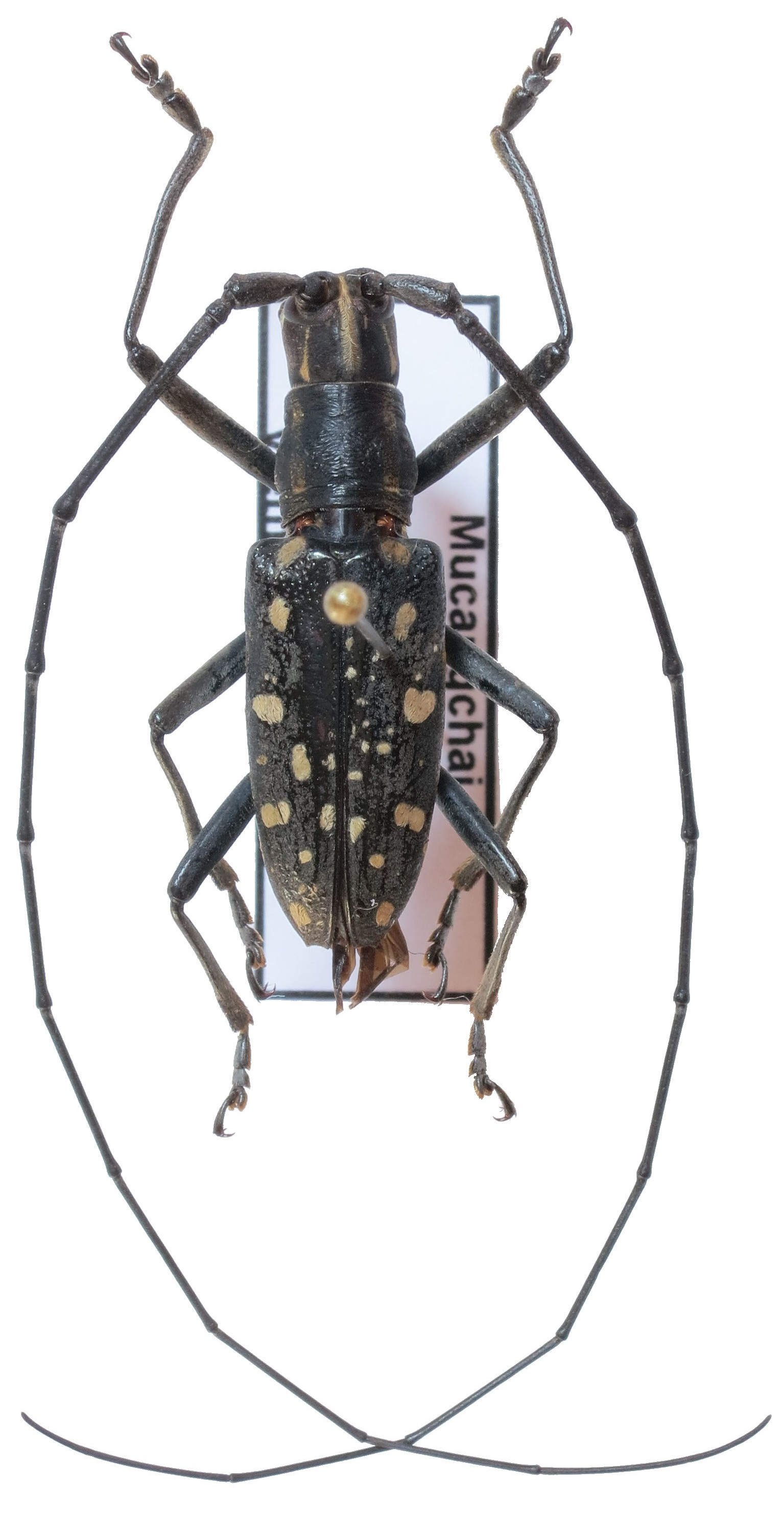
- Macrochenus assamensis from Yen Bai, Vietnam

Scientific classification
- Kingdom: Animalia
- Phylum: Arthropoda
- Class: Insecta
- Order: Coleoptera
- Suborder: Polyphaga
- Infraorder: Cucujiformia
- Family: Cerambycidae
- Genus: Macrochenus
- Species: M. assamensis

Binomial name
- Macrochenus assamensis Breuning, 1935

= Macrochenus assamensis =

Species of beetle

Macrochenus assamensis is a species of beetle in the family Cerambycidae. It was described by Stephan von Breuning in 1935. It is known from India.
