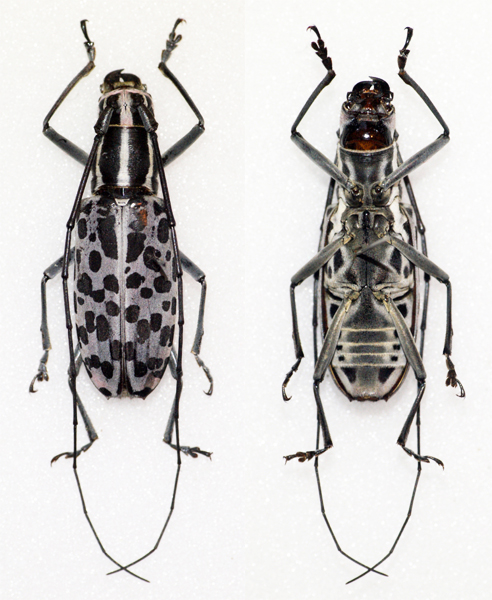
- Macrochenus isabellinus

Scientific classification
- Kingdom: Animalia
- Phylum: Arthropoda
- Clade: Pancrustacea
- Class: Insecta
- Order: Coleoptera
- Suborder: Polyphaga
- Infraorder: Cucujiformia
- Family: Cerambycidae
- Subfamily: Lamiinae
- Tribe: Lamiini
- Genus: Macrochenus

Synonyms
- Mecotagus Pascoe, 1866

= Macrochenus =

Genus of beetles

Macrochenus is a genus of longhorn beetles of the subfamily Lamiinae; species records are from South and South-East Asia.

== Species ==
GBIF includes:

1. Macrochenus assamensis Breuning, 1935
2. Macrochenus atkinsoni Gahan, 1893
3. Macrochenus guerini (White, 1858) (synonym Macrochenus isabellinus Aurivillius, 1920)
4. Macrochenus lacordairei (Thomson, 1865)
5. Macrochenus melanospilus Gahan, 1906
6. Macrochenus tigrinus (Olivier, 1792)
7. Macrochenus tonkinensis Aurivillius, 1920 (synonym Macrochenus semijunctus)
