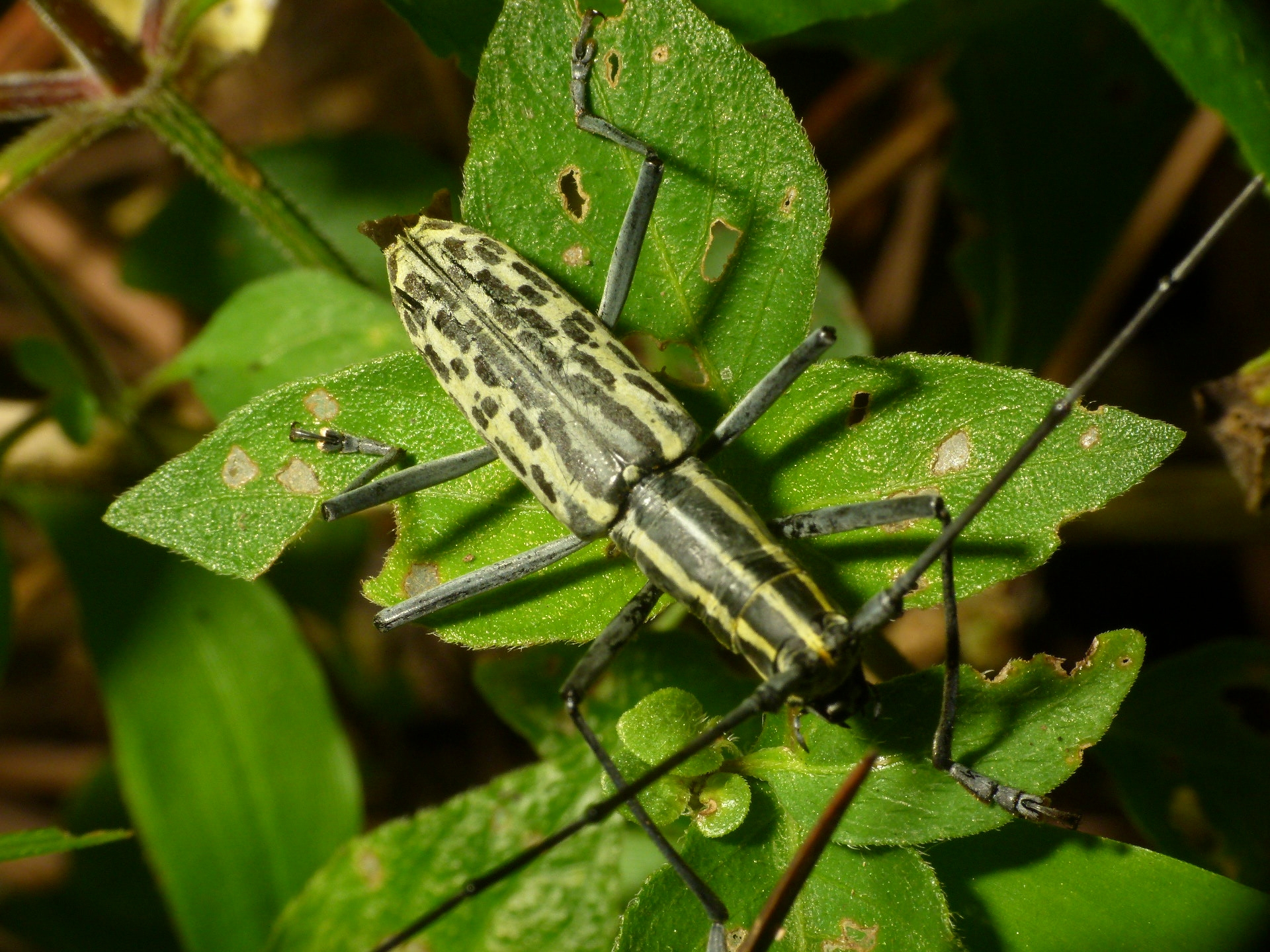

Scientific classification
- Kingdom: Animalia
- Phylum: Arthropoda
- Clade: Pancrustacea
- Class: Insecta
- Order: Coleoptera
- Suborder: Polyphaga
- Infraorder: Cucujiformia
- Family: Cerambycidae
- Genus: Macrochenus
- Species: M. tigrinus

Binomial name
- Macrochenus tigrinus (Olivier, 1792)

Synonyms
- Cerambyx tigrinus Olivier, 1795 nec DeGeer, 1775; Mecotagus birmanus Thomson, 1878; Mecotagus tigrinus (Olivier, 1792)

= Macrochenus tigrinus =

Species of beetle

Macrochenus tigrinus is a species of beetle in the family Cerambycidae. It was described by Guillaume-Antoine Olivier in 1792, originally under the genus Cerambyx. It is known from Sri Lanka, India and Myanmar. It contains the varietas Macrochenus tigrinus var. tesselatus.
