= Macrochenus atkinsoni =

Scientific classification
- Domain: Eukaryota
- Kingdom: Animalia
- Phylum: Arthropoda
- Class: Insecta
- Order: Coleoptera
- Suborder: Polyphaga
- Infraorder: Cucujiformia
- Family: Cerambycidae
- Genus: Macrochenus
- Species: M. atkinsoni

Binomial name
- Macrochenus atkinsoni Gahan, 1893

Species of beetle

Macrochenus atkinsoni is a species of beetle in the family Cerambycidae. It was described by Charles Joseph Gahan in 1893. It is known from the Nicobar and Andaman Islands.
