= Macrochenus semijunctus =

Scientific classification
- Kingdom: Animalia
- Phylum: Arthropoda
- Class: Insecta
- Order: Coleoptera
- Suborder: Polyphaga
- Infraorder: Cucujiformia
- Family: Cerambycidae
- Genus: Macrochenus
- Species: M. semijunctus

Binomial name
- Macrochenus semijunctus Pic, 1944

Species of beetle

Macrochenus semijunctus is a species of beetle in the family Cerambycidae. It was described by Maurice Pic in 1944. It is known from Vietnam.
