= Macrochenus tonkinensis =

Scientific classification
- Domain: Eukaryota
- Kingdom: Animalia
- Phylum: Arthropoda
- Class: Insecta
- Order: Coleoptera
- Suborder: Polyphaga
- Infraorder: Cucujiformia
- Family: Cerambycidae
- Genus: Macrochenus
- Species: M. tonkinensis

Binomial name
- Macrochenus tonkinensis Aurivillius, 1920

Synonyms
- Macrochenus inarmata Gressitt, 1940

Species of beetle

Macrochenus tonkinensis is a species of beetle in the family Cerambycidae. It was described by Per Olof Christopher Aurivillius in 1920. It is known from Vietnam and China.
