= Macrochenus melanospilus =

Scientific classification
- Kingdom: Animalia
- Phylum: Arthropoda
- Class: Insecta
- Order: Coleoptera
- Suborder: Polyphaga
- Infraorder: Cucujiformia
- Family: Cerambycidae
- Genus: Macrochenus
- Species: M. melanospilus

Binomial name
- Macrochenus melanospilus Gahan, 1906

Species of beetle

Macrochenus melanospilus is a species of beetle in the family Cerambycidae. It was described by Charles Joseph Gahan in 1906. It is known from Malaysia and Borneo.
