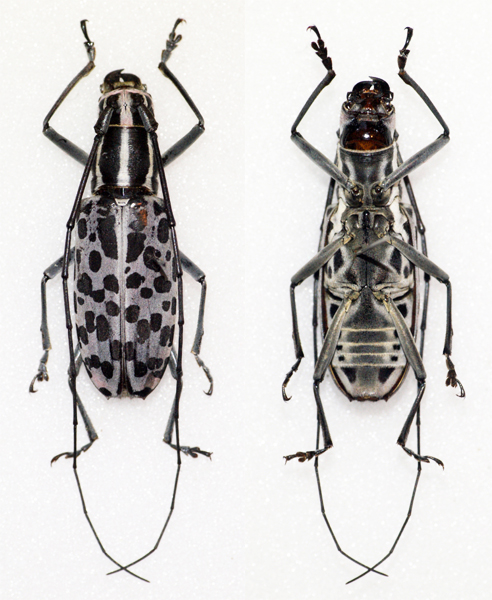
- Macrochenus isabellinus

Scientific classification
- Domain: Eukaryota
- Kingdom: Animalia
- Phylum: Arthropoda
- Class: Insecta
- Order: Coleoptera
- Suborder: Polyphaga
- Infraorder: Cucujiformia
- Family: Cerambycidae
- Genus: Macrochenus
- Species: M. isabellinus

Binomial name
- Macrochenus isabellinus Aurivillius, 1920

Synonyms
- Macrochenus guerini (White, 1858)

= Macrochenus isabellinus =

Species of beetle

Macrochenus isabellinus is a species of beetle in the family Cerambycidae. It was described by Per Olof Christopher Aurivillius in 1920. It is known from Thailand, Laos, China, Myanmar, and Vietnam.
