= Anamera gigantea =

Scientific classification
- Kingdom: Animalia
- Phylum: Arthropoda
- Class: Insecta
- Order: Coleoptera
- Suborder: Polyphaga
- Infraorder: Cucujiformia
- Family: Cerambycidae
- Genus: Anamera
- Species: A. gigantea

Binomial name
- Anamera gigantea Breuning, 1935

Species of beetle

Anamera gigantea is a species of beetle in the family Cerambycidae. It was described by Stephan von Breuning in 1935. It is known from Pakistan and India.

== Subspecies ==
- Anamera gigantea gigantea Breuning, 1935
- Anamera gigantea iliyashenkoi Jiroux, Garreau & Gurko, 2012
