= Anamera concolor =

Scientific classification
- Domain: Eukaryota
- Kingdom: Animalia
- Phylum: Arthropoda
- Class: Insecta
- Order: Coleoptera
- Suborder: Polyphaga
- Infraorder: Cucujiformia
- Family: Cerambycidae
- Tribe: Lamiini
- Genus: Anamera
- Species: A. concolor

Binomial name
- Anamera concolor Lacordaire, 1869

Species of beetle

Anamera concolor is a species of beetle in the family Cerambycidae. It was described by Lacordaire in 1869. It is known from Laos.
