= Anamera fulvescens =

Scientific classification
- Domain: Eukaryota
- Kingdom: Animalia
- Phylum: Arthropoda
- Class: Insecta
- Order: Coleoptera
- Suborder: Polyphaga
- Infraorder: Cucujiformia
- Family: Cerambycidae
- Tribe: Lamiini
- Genus: Anamera
- Species: A. fulvescens

Binomial name
- Anamera fulvescens Gahan, 1893

Species of beetle

Anamera fulvescens is a species of beetle in the family Cerambycidae. It was described by Charles Joseph Gahan in 1893. It is known from India.
