= Anamera strandiella =

Scientific classification
- Kingdom: Animalia
- Phylum: Arthropoda
- Class: Insecta
- Order: Coleoptera
- Suborder: Polyphaga
- Infraorder: Cucujiformia
- Family: Cerambycidae
- Genus: Anamera
- Species: A. strandiella

Binomial name
- Anamera strandiella Breuning, 1944

Synonyms
- Melanauster strandi Breuning, 1936

Species of beetle

Anamera strandiella is a species of beetle in the family Cerambycidae. It was described by Stephan von Breuning in 1944, and is endemic to India.
