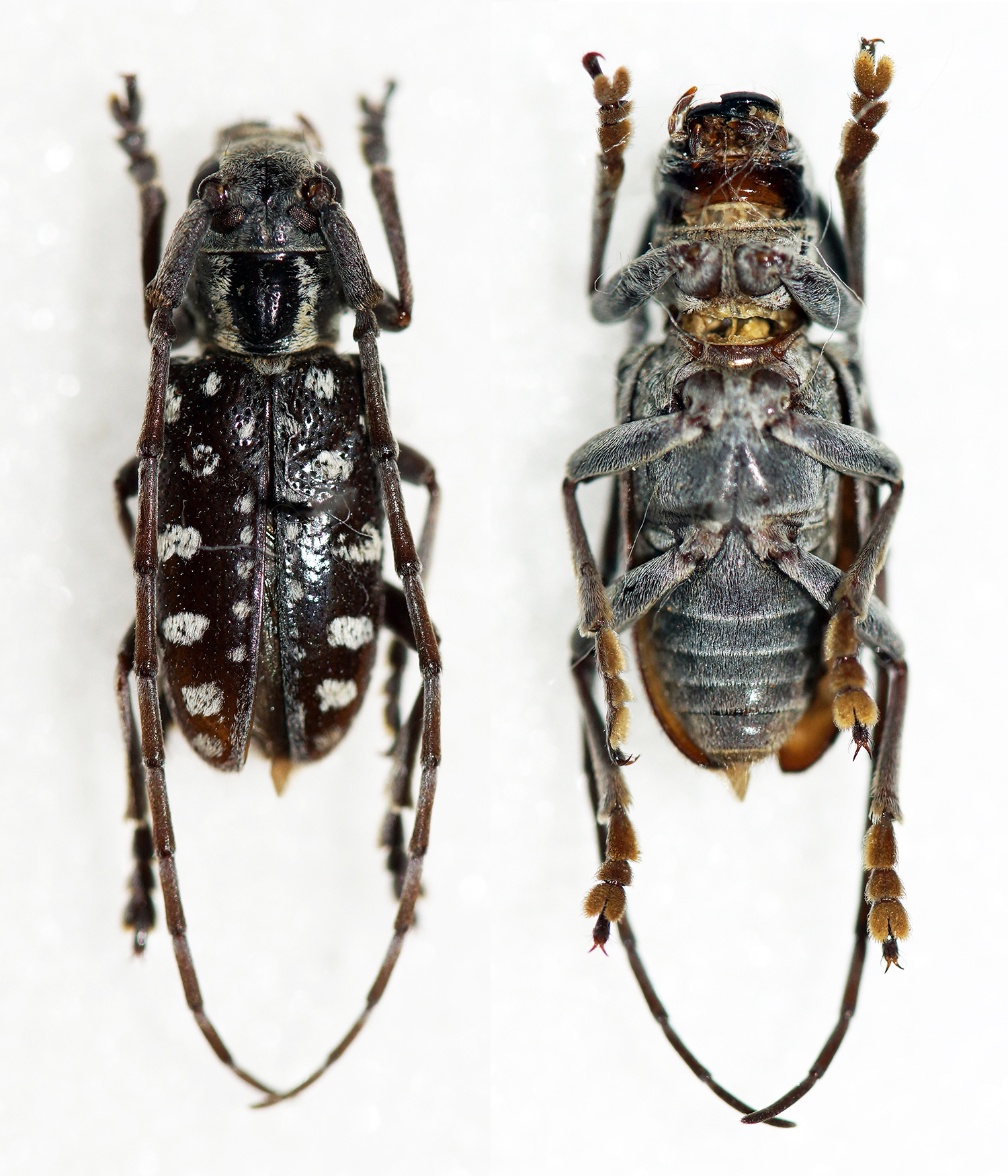
- Anamera alboguttata

Scientific classification
- Domain: Eukaryota
- Kingdom: Animalia
- Phylum: Arthropoda
- Class: Insecta
- Order: Coleoptera
- Suborder: Polyphaga
- Infraorder: Cucujiformia
- Family: Cerambycidae
- Tribe: Lamiini
- Genus: Anamera; Thomson, 1864

= Anamera =

Genus of beetles

Anamera is a genus of longhorn beetles of the subfamily Lamiinae, containing the following species:

- Anamera alboguttata Thomson, 1864
- Anamera concolor Lacordaire, 1869
- Anamera densemaculata Breuning, 1940
- Anamera fulvescens Gahan, 1893
- Anamera gigantea Breuning, 1935
- Anamera harmandi Pic, 1936
- Anamera obesa Pic, 1928
- Anamera similis Breuning, 1938
- Anamera strandi Breuning, 1935
- Anamera strandiella Breuning, 1944
