= Anamera harmandi =

Scientific classification
- Kingdom: Animalia
- Phylum: Arthropoda
- Class: Insecta
- Order: Coleoptera
- Suborder: Polyphaga
- Infraorder: Cucujiformia
- Family: Cerambycidae
- Genus: Anamera
- Species: A. harmandi

Binomial name
- Anamera harmandi Pic, 1936

Species of beetle

Anamera harmandi is a species of beetle in the family Cerambycidae. It was described by Maurice Pic in 1936. It is known from Laos and Thailand.
