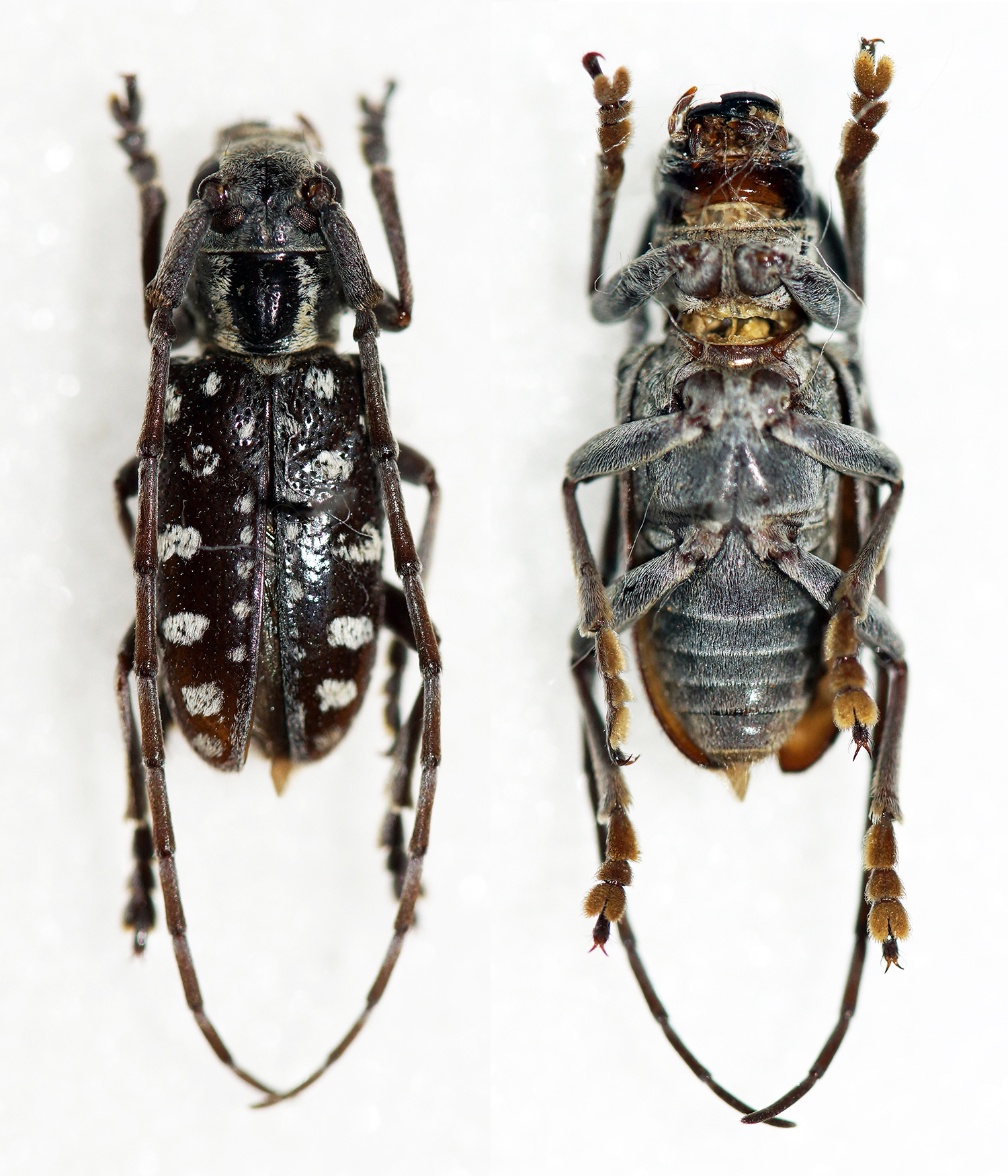

Scientific classification
- Domain: Eukaryota
- Kingdom: Animalia
- Phylum: Arthropoda
- Class: Insecta
- Order: Coleoptera
- Suborder: Polyphaga
- Infraorder: Cucujiformia
- Family: Cerambycidae
- Tribe: Lamiini
- Genus: Anamera
- Species: A. alboguttata

Binomial name
- Anamera alboguttata Thomson, 1864

= Anamera alboguttata =

Species of beetle

Anamera alboguttata is a species of beetle in the family Cerambycidae. It was described by James Thomson in 1864. It is known from Laos, Vietnam, India, Myanmar, and Thailand.
