= Anamera obesa =

Scientific classification
- Kingdom: Animalia
- Phylum: Arthropoda
- Class: Insecta
- Order: Coleoptera
- Suborder: Polyphaga
- Infraorder: Cucujiformia
- Family: Cerambycidae
- Genus: Anamera
- Species: A. obesa

Binomial name
- Anamera obesa Pic, 1928

Species of beetle

Anamera obesa is a species of beetle in the family Cerambycidae. It was described by Maurice Pic in 1928. It is known from Myanmar, Laos and Vietnam.
