= Acalolepta sejuncta =

Scientific classification
- Domain: Eukaryota
- Kingdom: Animalia
- Phylum: Arthropoda
- Class: Insecta
- Order: Coleoptera
- Suborder: Polyphaga
- Infraorder: Cucujiformia
- Family: Cerambycidae
- Tribe: Lamiini
- Genus: Acalolepta
- Species: A. sejuncta

Binomial name
- Acalolepta sejuncta Bates, 1873

Species of beetle

Acalolepta sejuncta is a species of beetle in the family Cerambycidae. It was described by Henry Walter Bates in 1873. It is known from Japan.

== Subspecies ==
- Acalolepta sejuncta amaiana (Hayashi, 1962)
- Acalolepta sejuncta hachijoensis (Gressitt, 1956)
- Acalolepta sejuncta hamai (Hayashi, 1962)
- Acalolepta sejuncta izuinsulana Hayashi, 1968
- Acalolepta sejuncta morii Makihara, 1980
- Acalolepta sejuncta okinawensis Breuning & Ohbayashi, 1966
- Acalolepta sejuncta sejuncta Bates, 1873
- Acalolepta sejuncta tsushimae (Breuning, 1960)
