= Acalolepta solata =

Scientific classification
- Kingdom: Animalia
- Phylum: Arthropoda
- Class: Insecta
- Order: Coleoptera
- Suborder: Polyphaga
- Infraorder: Cucujiformia
- Family: Cerambycidae
- Genus: Acalolepta
- Species: A. solata

Binomial name
- Acalolepta solata (Pascoe, 1866)

Synonyms
- Dihammus convexus (Pascoe) Breuning, 1944 (partim.) p; Monohammus solatus Pascoe, 1866

Species of beetle

Acalolepta solata is a species of beetle in the family Cerambycidae. It was described by Francis Polkinghorne Pascoe in 1866. It is known from Moluccas.
