= Acalolepta lineata =

Scientific classification
- Kingdom: Animalia
- Phylum: Arthropoda
- Class: Insecta
- Order: Coleoptera
- Suborder: Polyphaga
- Infraorder: Cucujiformia
- Family: Cerambycidae
- Genus: Acalolepta
- Species: A. lineata

Binomial name
- Acalolepta lineata (Breuning, 1939)

Synonyms
- Dihammus lineatus Breuning, 1939

Species of beetle

Acalolepta lineata is a species of beetle in the family Cerambycidae. It was described by Stephan von Breuning in 1939. It is known from Malaysia.
