= Acalolepta sericeomicans =

Scientific classification
- Kingdom: Animalia
- Phylum: Arthropoda
- Class: Insecta
- Order: Coleoptera
- Suborder: Polyphaga
- Infraorder: Cucujiformia
- Family: Cerambycidae
- Genus: Acalolepta
- Species: A. sericeomicans

Binomial name
- Acalolepta sericeomicans (Fairmaire, 1889)

Synonyms
- Cypriola sericeomicans (Fairmaire, 1889); Monochamus sericeomicans Fairmaire, 1889

Species of beetle

Acalolepta sericeomicans is a species of beetle in the family Cerambycidae. It was described by Léon Fairmaire in 1889. It is known from China.
