= Acalolepta riouensis =

Scientific classification
- Domain: Eukaryota
- Kingdom: Animalia
- Phylum: Arthropoda
- Class: Insecta
- Order: Coleoptera
- Suborder: Polyphaga
- Infraorder: Cucujiformia
- Family: Cerambycidae
- Tribe: Lamiini
- Genus: Acalolepta
- Species: A. riouensis

Binomial name
- Acalolepta riouensis (Aurivillius, 1924)

Synonyms
- Dihammus riouensis Aurivillius, 1924

Species of beetle

Acalolepta riouensis is a species of beetle in the family Cerambycidae. It was described by Per Olof Christopher Aurivillius in 1924. It is known from Indonesia.
