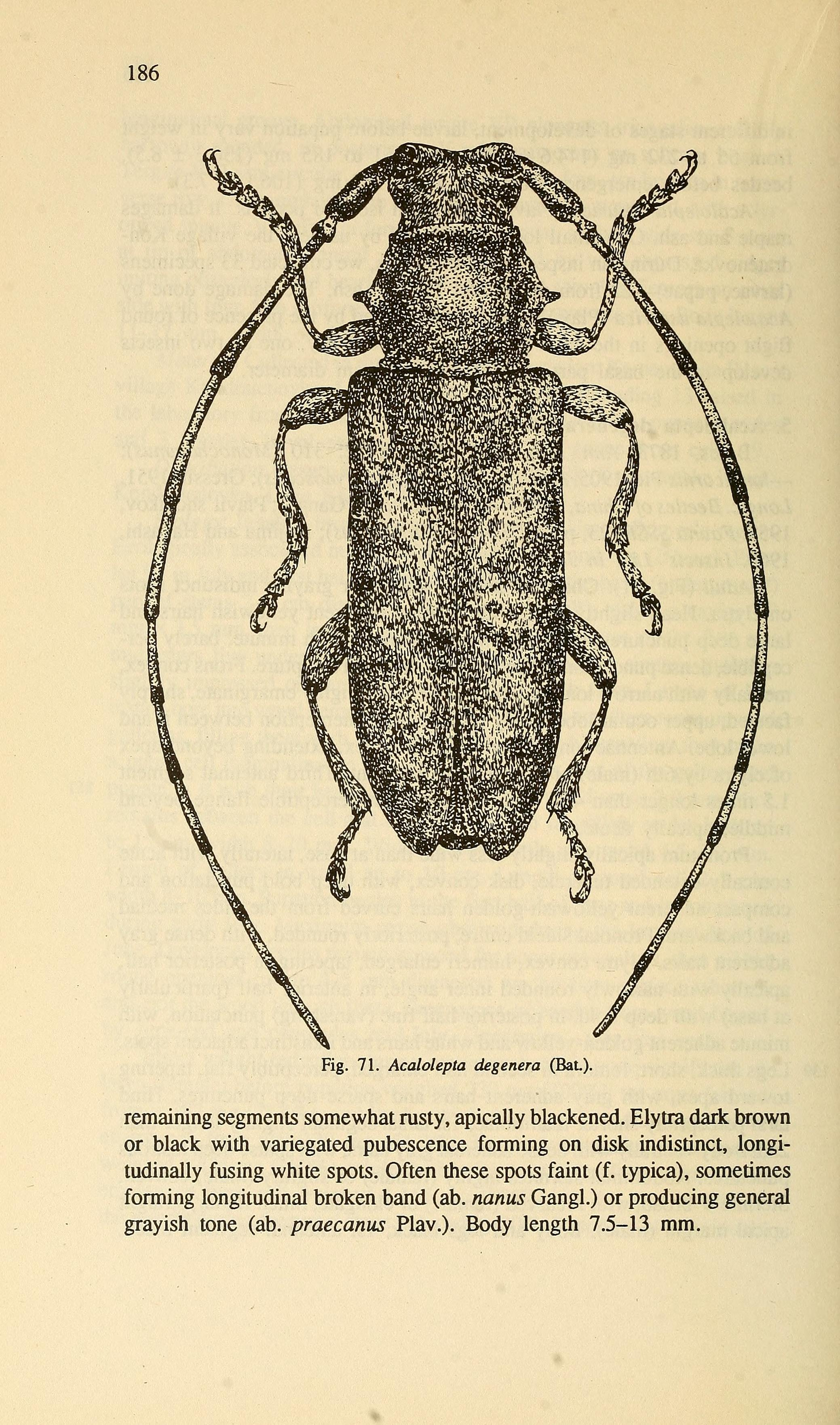

Scientific classification
- Domain: Eukaryota
- Kingdom: Animalia
- Phylum: Arthropoda
- Class: Insecta
- Order: Coleoptera
- Suborder: Polyphaga
- Infraorder: Cucujiformia
- Family: Cerambycidae
- Tribe: Lamiini
- Genus: Acalolepta
- Species: A. degener

Binomial name
- Acalolepta degener (Bates, 1873)

Synonyms
- Acalolepta Astynoscelis degener Bates, 1873; Acalolepta Astynoscelis longicornis Pic, 1905; Acalolepta Haplohammus contemptus Gahan, 1888; Acalolepta Haplohammus nanus Ganglbauer, 1890; Acalolepta Orsidis savioi Pic, 1925; Acalolepta Saitoa teneburosa Matsushita, 1937; Acalolepta Monohammus degener Bates, 1873

= Acalolepta degener =

Species of beetle

Acalolepta degener is a species of beetle in the longhorn beetle family.
