= Acalolepta neopommeriana =

Scientific classification
- Kingdom: Animalia
- Phylum: Arthropoda
- Class: Insecta
- Order: Coleoptera
- Suborder: Polyphaga
- Infraorder: Cucujiformia
- Family: Cerambycidae
- Genus: Acalolepta
- Species: A. neopommeriana

Binomial name
- Acalolepta neopommeriana (Breuning, 1938)

Synonyms
- Dihammus neopommerianus Breuning, 1938

Species of beetle

Acalolepta neopommeriana is a species of beetle in the family Cerambycidae. It was described by Stephan von Breuning in 1938. It is known from Papua New Guinea.
