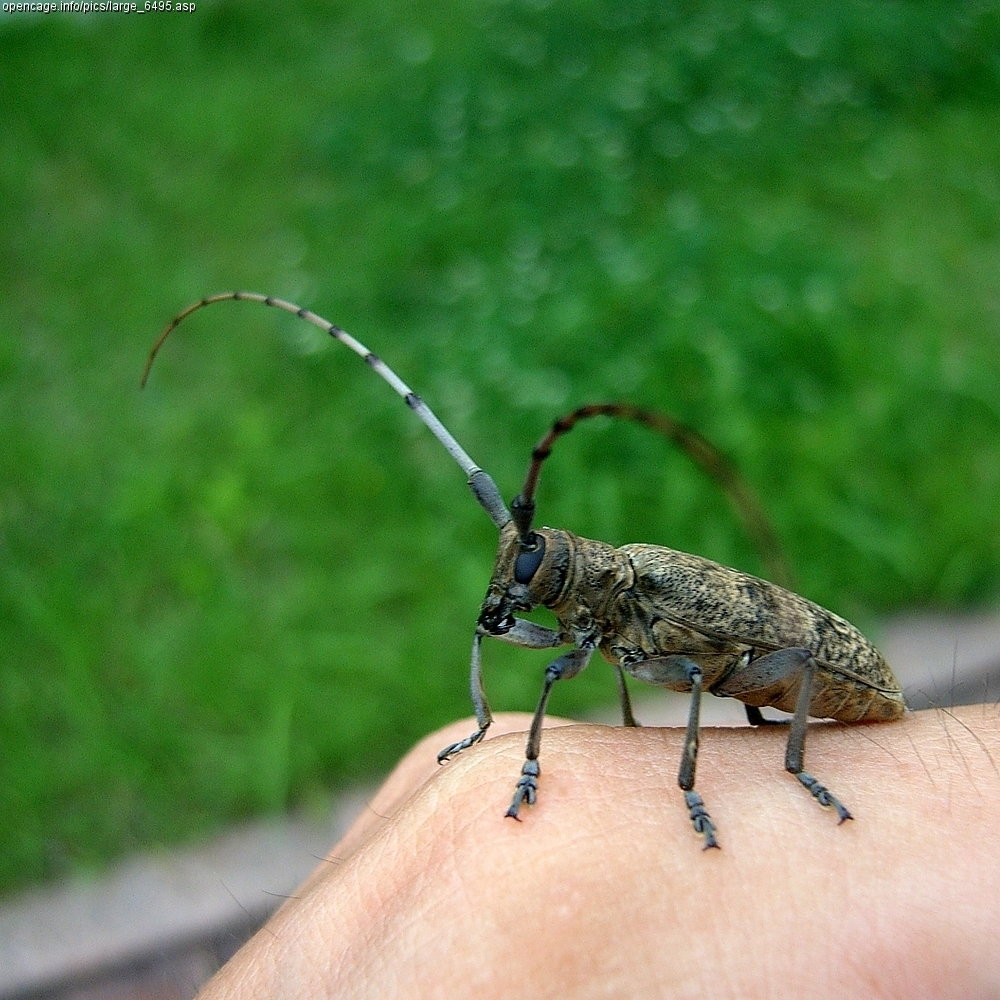

Scientific classification
- Domain: Eukaryota
- Kingdom: Animalia
- Phylum: Arthropoda
- Class: Insecta
- Order: Coleoptera
- Suborder: Polyphaga
- Infraorder: Cucujiformia
- Family: Cerambycidae
- Tribe: Lamiini
- Genus: Acalolepta
- Species: A. luxuriosa

Binomial name
- Acalolepta luxuriosa (Bates, 1873)

= Acalolepta luxuriosa =

Species of beetle

Acalolepta luxuriosa (also known as the Udo longhorn beetle) is a beetle in the longhorn beetle family. The Japanese common name is Japanese: sen-no-kamikiri.

Mating Male Acalolepta luxuriousa will often wander around in order to look for females, and much more active than their counterparts often even flying greater distances to locate females. Once the female is located licking, grasping, copulation, and mounting is oriented by the active male, even if it is an uncooperative female (Wang). The copulations would last between 20 seconds to 10 minutes, usually last in average of about 4 minutes (Akutsu et al.).
