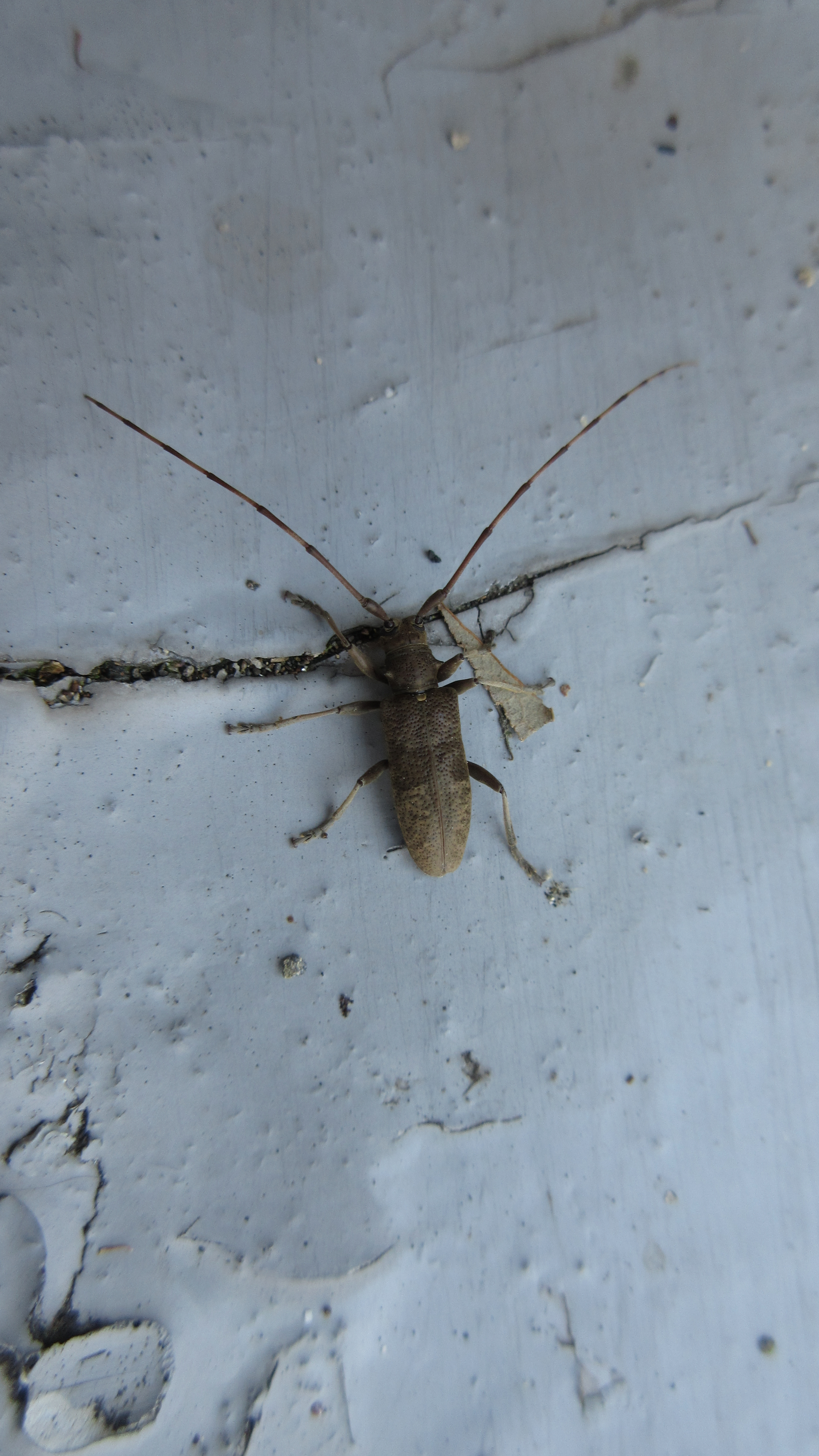

Scientific classification
- Domain: Eukaryota
- Kingdom: Animalia
- Phylum: Arthropoda
- Class: Insecta
- Order: Coleoptera
- Suborder: Polyphaga
- Infraorder: Cucujiformia
- Family: Cerambycidae
- Tribe: Lamiini
- Genus: Acalolepta
- Species: A. fraudatrix

Binomial name
- Acalolepta fraudatrix (Bates, 1873)

= Acalolepta fraudatrix =

Species of beetle

Acalolepta fraudatrix is a species of beetle in the family Cerambycidae. It was described by Henry Walter Bates in 1873. It is known from Korea, Japan, China, and Russia.

== Subspecies ==
- Acalolepta fraudatrix fraudatrix (Bates, 1873)
- Acalolepta fraudatrix mogii Makihara, 1980
- Acalolepta fraudatrix nigricornis Makihara, 1977
- Acalolepta fraudatrix satoi Breuning & Ohbayashi, 1966
- Acalolepta fraudatrix yakushimana Yokoyama, 1971
