= Acalolepta mausoni =

Scientific classification
- Kingdom: Animalia
- Phylum: Arthropoda
- Class: Insecta
- Order: Coleoptera
- Suborder: Polyphaga
- Infraorder: Cucujiformia
- Family: Cerambycidae
- Genus: Acalolepta
- Species: A. mausoni

Binomial name
- Acalolepta mausoni (Breuning, 1954)

Synonyms
- Cypriola mausoni Breuning, 1954

Species of beetle

Acalolepta mausoni is a species of beetle in the family Cerambycidae. It was described by Stephan von Breuning in 1954. It is known from Vietnam.
