= Acalolepta sericeiceps =

Scientific classification
- Domain: Eukaryota
- Kingdom: Animalia
- Phylum: Arthropoda
- Class: Insecta
- Order: Coleoptera
- Suborder: Polyphaga
- Infraorder: Cucujiformia
- Family: Cerambycidae
- Tribe: Lamiini
- Genus: Acalolepta
- Species: A. sericeiceps

Binomial name
- Acalolepta sericeiceps (Kriesche, 1936)

Synonyms
- Acalolepta lessoni sericeiceps (Kriesche) Bigger & Schofild, 1983; Dihammus lessoni sericeiceps Kriesche, 1936

Species of beetle

Acalolepta sericeiceps is a species of beetle in the family Cerambycidae. It was described by Kriesche in 1936, originally under the genus Dihammus. It is known from Papua New Guinea. It measures between 29 and 31 mm (1.1 and 1.2 in).
