= Acalolepta tenasserimensis =

Scientific classification
- Kingdom: Animalia
- Phylum: Arthropoda
- Class: Insecta
- Order: Coleoptera
- Suborder: Polyphaga
- Infraorder: Cucujiformia
- Family: Cerambycidae
- Genus: Acalolepta
- Species: A. tenasserimensis

Binomial name
- Acalolepta tenasserimensis (Breuning, 1960)

Synonyms
- Cypriola tenasserimensis Breuning, 1960

Species of beetle

Acalolepta tenasserimensis is a species of beetle in the family Cerambycidae. It was described by Breuning in 1960. It is known from Myanmar and Malaysia.
