= Acalolepta submaculata =

Scientific classification
- Kingdom: Animalia
- Phylum: Arthropoda
- Clade: Pancrustacea
- Class: Insecta
- Order: Coleoptera
- Suborder: Polyphaga
- Infraorder: Cucujiformia
- Family: Cerambycidae
- Genus: Acalolepta
- Species: A. submaculata

Binomial name
- Acalolepta submaculata (Gilmour, 1947)

Synonyms
- Dihammus submaculatus Gilmour, 1947; Sternohammus sanghiricus Breuning, 1956

Species of beetle

Acalolepta submaculata is a species of beetle in the family Cerambycidae. It was described by E. Forrest Gilmour in 1947. It is known from Sulawesi.
