= Acalolepta breuningi =

Scientific classification
- Domain: Eukaryota
- Kingdom: Animalia
- Phylum: Arthropoda
- Class: Insecta
- Order: Coleoptera
- Suborder: Polyphaga
- Infraorder: Cucujiformia
- Family: Cerambycidae
- Tribe: Lamiini
- Genus: Acalolepta
- Species: A. breuningi

Binomial name
- Acalolepta breuningi (Gressitt, 1951)

Synonyms
- Dihammus breuningi Gressitt, 1951

Species of beetle

Acalolepta breuningi is a species of beetle in the family Cerambycidae. It was described by Gressitt in 1951. It is known from China.
