= Acalolepta fuscomarmorata =

Scientific classification
- Kingdom: Animalia
- Phylum: Arthropoda
- Class: Insecta
- Order: Coleoptera
- Suborder: Polyphaga
- Infraorder: Cucujiformia
- Family: Cerambycidae
- Genus: Acalolepta
- Species: A. fuscomarmorata

Binomial name
- Acalolepta fuscomarmorata (Breuning, 1940)

Synonyms
- Dihammus fuscomarmoratus Breuning, 1940

Species of beetle

Acalolepta fuscomarmorata is a species of beetle in the family Cerambycidae. It was described by Stephan von Breuning in 1940. It is known from Borneo.
