= Acalolepta argentata =

Scientific classification
- Domain: Eukaryota
- Kingdom: Animalia
- Phylum: Arthropoda
- Class: Insecta
- Order: Coleoptera
- Suborder: Polyphaga
- Infraorder: Cucujiformia
- Family: Cerambycidae
- Tribe: Lamiini
- Genus: Acalolepta
- Species: A. argentata

Binomial name
- Acalolepta argentata (Aurivillius, 1911)

Synonyms
- Dihammus argentatus (Aurivillius, 1911); Haplohammus argentatus Aurivillius, 1911

Species of beetle

Acalolepta argentata is a species of beetle in the family Cerambycidae. It was described by Per Olof Christopher Aurivillius in 1911. It is known from Australia.
