= Acalolepta semisericea =

Scientific classification
- Kingdom: Animalia
- Phylum: Arthropoda
- Class: Insecta
- Order: Coleoptera
- Suborder: Polyphaga
- Infraorder: Cucujiformia
- Family: Cerambycidae
- Genus: Acalolepta
- Species: A. semisericea

Binomial name
- Acalolepta semisericea (Pic, 1935)

Synonyms
- Dihammus semisericeus Breuning, 1936 nec Pic, 1935; Dihamus semisericeus Pic, 1935

Species of beetle

Acalolepta semisericea is a species of beetle in the family Cerambycidae. It was described by Maurice Pic in 1935. It is known from China.
