= Acalolepta fuscosparsuta =

Scientific classification
- Kingdom: Animalia
- Phylum: Arthropoda
- Class: Insecta
- Order: Coleoptera
- Suborder: Polyphaga
- Infraorder: Cucujiformia
- Family: Cerambycidae
- Genus: Acalolepta
- Species: A. fuscosparsuta

Binomial name
- Acalolepta fuscosparsuta (Breuning, 1953)

Synonyms
- Cypriola fuscosparsuta Breuning, 1953

Species of beetle

Acalolepta fuscosparsuta is a species of beetle in the family Cerambycidae. It was described by Stephan von Breuning in 1953. It is known from Papua New Guinea.
