= Acalolepta formosana =

Scientific classification
- Kingdom: Animalia
- Phylum: Arthropoda
- Class: Insecta
- Order: Coleoptera
- Suborder: Polyphaga
- Infraorder: Cucujiformia
- Family: Cerambycidae
- Genus: Acalolepta
- Species: A. formosana

Binomial name
- Acalolepta formosana (Breuning, 1935)

Synonyms
- Dihammus formosanus Breuning, 1935

Species of beetle

Acalolepta formosana is a species of beetle in the family Cerambycidae. It was described by Stephan von Breuning in 1935. It is endemic to Taiwan.

Acalolepta formosana measure 17–27 mm (0.67–1.06 in) in body length.
