= Acalolepta pseudosericans =

Scientific classification
- Kingdom: Animalia
- Phylum: Arthropoda
- Class: Insecta
- Order: Coleoptera
- Suborder: Polyphaga
- Infraorder: Cucujiformia
- Family: Cerambycidae
- Genus: Acalolepta
- Species: A. pseudosericans

Binomial name
- Acalolepta pseudosericans (Breuning, 1949)

Synonyms
- Cypriola pseudosericans Breuning, 1949; Dihammus sericeomicans (Fairmaire, 1889)

Species of beetle

Acalolepta pseudosericans is a species of beetle in the family Cerambycidae. It was described by Stephan von Breuning in 1949. It is known from Vietnam.
