= Acalolepta boninensis =

Scientific classification
- Kingdom: Animalia
- Phylum: Arthropoda
- Class: Insecta
- Order: Coleoptera
- Suborder: Polyphaga
- Infraorder: Cucujiformia
- Family: Cerambycidae
- Genus: Acalolepta
- Species: A. boninensis

Binomial name
- Acalolepta boninensis Hayashi, 1971

Species of beetle

Acalolepta boninensis is a species of beetle in the family Cerambycidae. It was described by Hayashi in 1971.
