= Acalolepta nagporensis =

Scientific classification
- Kingdom: Animalia
- Phylum: Arthropoda
- Class: Insecta
- Order: Coleoptera
- Suborder: Polyphaga
- Infraorder: Cucujiformia
- Family: Cerambycidae
- Genus: Acalolepta
- Species: A. nagporensis

Binomial name
- Acalolepta nagporensis Breuning, 1982

Species of beetle

Acalolepta nagporensis is a species of beetle in the family Cerambycidae. It was described by Stephan von Breuning in 1982. It is known from India.
