= Acalolepta rotundipennis =

Scientific classification
- Kingdom: Animalia
- Phylum: Arthropoda
- Class: Insecta
- Order: Coleoptera
- Suborder: Polyphaga
- Infraorder: Cucujiformia
- Family: Cerambycidae
- Genus: Acalolepta
- Species: A. rotundipennis

Binomial name
- Acalolepta rotundipennis (Breuning, 1942)inq.

Synonyms
- Dihammus rotundipennis Breuning, 1942

Species of beetle

Acalolepta rotundipennis is a species of beetle in the family Cerambycidae. It was described by Stephan von Breuning in 1942. It is known from Moluccas.
