= Acalolepta atroolivacea =

Scientific classification
- Kingdom: Animalia
- Phylum: Arthropoda
- Class: Insecta
- Order: Coleoptera
- Suborder: Polyphaga
- Infraorder: Cucujiformia
- Family: Cerambycidae
- Genus: Acalolepta
- Species: A. atroolivacea

Binomial name
- Acalolepta atroolivacea (Gilmour, 1956)

Synonyms
- Dihammus atro-olivaceus Gilmour, 1956; Dihammus atro-olivaceus var. brunnefasciata Gilmour, 1956

Species of beetle

Acalolepta atroolivacea is a species of beetle in the family Cerambycidae. It was described by Gilmour in 1956. It is known from Papua New Guinea.
