= Acalolepta pseudomarmorata =

Scientific classification
- Kingdom: Animalia
- Phylum: Arthropoda
- Class: Insecta
- Order: Coleoptera
- Suborder: Polyphaga
- Infraorder: Cucujiformia
- Family: Cerambycidae
- Genus: Acalolepta
- Species: A. pseudomarmorata

Binomial name
- Acalolepta pseudomarmorata (Breuning, 1944)

Synonyms
- Dihammus marmoratus Breuning, 1936 nec Fisher, 1935; Dihammus pseudomarmoratus Breuning, 1944

Species of beetle

Acalolepta pseudomarmorata is a species of beetle in the family Cerambycidae. It was described by Stephan von Breuning in 1944. It is known from Papua New Guinea.
