= Acalolepta holotephra =

Scientific classification
- Domain: Eukaryota
- Kingdom: Animalia
- Phylum: Arthropoda
- Class: Insecta
- Order: Coleoptera
- Suborder: Polyphaga
- Infraorder: Cucujiformia
- Family: Cerambycidae
- Tribe: Lamiini
- Genus: Acalolepta
- Species: A. holotephra

Binomial name
- Acalolepta holotephra (Boisduval, 1835)

Synonyms
- Dihammus holotephrus (Boisduval, 1835); Haplohammus samoanus Aurivillius, 1913

Species of beetle

Acalolepta holotephra is a species of beetle in the family Cerambycidae. It was described by Jean Baptiste Boisduval in 1835. It is known from the Solomon Islands, Australia, and Papua New Guinea. It feeds on Theobroma cacao.
