= Acalolepta oshimana =

Scientific classification
- Kingdom: Animalia
- Phylum: Arthropoda
- Class: Insecta
- Order: Coleoptera
- Suborder: Polyphaga
- Infraorder: Cucujiformia
- Family: Cerambycidae
- Genus: Acalolepta
- Species: A. oshimana

Binomial name
- Acalolepta oshimana (Breuning, 1954)

Species of beetle

Acalolepta oshimana is a species of beetle in the family Cerambycidae. It was described by Stephan von Breuning in 1954.

== Subspecies ==
- Acalolepta oshimana omoro Hayashi, 1963
- Acalolepta oshimana oshimana (Breuning, 1954)
