= Acalolepta laevicollis =

Scientific classification
- Kingdom: Animalia
- Phylum: Arthropoda
- Class: Insecta
- Order: Coleoptera
- Suborder: Polyphaga
- Infraorder: Cucujiformia
- Family: Cerambycidae
- Genus: Acalolepta
- Species: A. laevicollis

Binomial name
- Acalolepta laevicollis Breuning, 1964

Species of beetle

Acalolepta laevicollis is a species of beetle in the family Cerambycidae. It was described by Stephan von Breuning in 1964. It is known from Laos.

Acalolepta laevicollis measure 20 mm (0.79 in) in length.
