= Acalolepta ferriei =

Scientific classification
- Kingdom: Animalia
- Phylum: Arthropoda
- Class: Insecta
- Order: Coleoptera
- Suborder: Polyphaga
- Infraorder: Cucujiformia
- Family: Cerambycidae
- Genus: Acalolepta
- Species: A. ferriei

Binomial name
- Acalolepta ferriei (Breuning, 1952)

Synonyms
- Cypriola ferriei Breuning, 1954

Species of beetle

Acalolepta ferriei is a species of beetle in the family Cerambycidae. It was described by Stephan von Breuning in 1952. It is known from Japan.
