= Acalolepta hainana =

Scientific classification
- Kingdom: Animalia
- Phylum: Arthropoda
- Class: Insecta
- Order: Coleoptera
- Suborder: Polyphaga
- Infraorder: Cucujiformia
- Family: Cerambycidae
- Genus: Acalolepta
- Species: A. hainana

Binomial name
- Acalolepta hainana (Breuning, 1959)

Synonyms
- Cypriola hainana Breuning, 1959

Species of beetle

Acalolepta hainana is a species of beetle in the family Cerambycidae. It was described by Stephan von Breuning in 1959. It is known from China.
