= Acalolepta pleuralis =

Scientific classification
- Domain: Eukaryota
- Kingdom: Animalia
- Phylum: Arthropoda
- Class: Insecta
- Order: Coleoptera
- Suborder: Polyphaga
- Infraorder: Cucujiformia
- Family: Cerambycidae
- Tribe: Lamiini
- Genus: Acalolepta
- Species: A. pleuralis

Binomial name
- Acalolepta pleuralis (Schwarzer, 1930)

Synonyms
- Orsidis pleuralis Schwarzer, 1930

Species of beetle

Acalolepta pleuralis is a species of beetle in the family Cerambycidae. It was described by Bernhard Schwarzer in 1930. It is known from Indonesia.
