= Acalolepta samarensis =

Scientific classification
- Domain: Eukaryota
- Kingdom: Animalia
- Phylum: Arthropoda
- Class: Insecta
- Order: Coleoptera
- Suborder: Polyphaga
- Infraorder: Cucujiformia
- Family: Cerambycidae
- Tribe: Lamiini
- Genus: Acalolepta
- Species: A. samarensis

Binomial name
- Acalolepta samarensis (Aurivillius, 1927)

Synonyms
- Acalolepta samariensis Aurivillius, 1927; Dihammus samarensis Aurivillius, 1927

Species of beetle

Acalolepta samarensis is a species of beetle in the family Cerambycidae. It was described by Per Olof Christopher Aurivillius in 1927. It is known from the Philippines.
