= Acalolepta bryanti =

Scientific classification
- Kingdom: Animalia
- Phylum: Arthropoda
- Class: Insecta
- Order: Coleoptera
- Suborder: Polyphaga
- Infraorder: Cucujiformia
- Family: Cerambycidae
- Genus: Acalolepta
- Species: A. bryanti

Binomial name
- Acalolepta bryanti (Breuning, 1938)

Synonyms
- Dihammus bryanti Breuning, 1938

Species of beetle

Acalolepta bryanti is a species of beetle in the family Cerambycidae. It was described by Stephan von Breuning in 1938. It is found in Malaysia and Borneo.
