= Acalolepta kusamai =

Scientific classification
- Kingdom: Animalia
- Phylum: Arthropoda
- Class: Insecta
- Order: Coleoptera
- Suborder: Polyphaga
- Infraorder: Cucujiformia
- Family: Cerambycidae
- Genus: Acalolepta
- Species: A. kusamai

Binomial name
- Acalolepta kusamai Hayashi, 1969

Species of beetle

Acalolepta kusamai is a species of beetle in the family Cerambycidae. It was described by Masao Hayashi in 1969. It is known from Japan, and from the Korean peninsula.
