= Acalolepta griseoplagiatoides =

Scientific classification
- Kingdom: Animalia
- Phylum: Arthropoda
- Class: Insecta
- Order: Coleoptera
- Suborder: Polyphaga
- Infraorder: Cucujiformia
- Family: Cerambycidae
- Genus: Acalolepta
- Species: A. griseoplagiatoides

Binomial name
- Acalolepta griseoplagiatoides Breuning, 1968

Species of beetle

Acalolepta griseoplagiatoides is a species of beetle in the family Cerambycidae. It was described by Stephan von Breuning in 1968. It is known from India.
