= Acalolepta subpustulata =

Scientific classification
- Kingdom: Animalia
- Phylum: Arthropoda
- Class: Insecta
- Order: Coleoptera
- Suborder: Polyphaga
- Infraorder: Cucujiformia
- Family: Cerambycidae
- Genus: Acalolepta
- Species: A. subpustulata

Binomial name
- Acalolepta subpustulata (Breuning, 1960)

Synonyms
- Cypriola subpustulata Breuning, 1960

Species of beetle

Acalolepta subpustulata is a species of beetle in the family Cerambycidae. It was described by Stephan von Breuning in 1960. It is known from Sumatra.
