= Acalolepta novaguineae =

Scientific classification
- Domain: Eukaryota
- Kingdom: Animalia
- Phylum: Arthropoda
- Class: Insecta
- Order: Coleoptera
- Suborder: Polyphaga
- Infraorder: Cucujiformia
- Family: Cerambycidae
- Tribe: Lamiini
- Genus: Acalolepta
- Species: A. novaguineae

Binomial name
- Acalolepta novaguineae (Gilmour, 1956)

Synonyms
- Dihammus novaguineae Gilmour, 1956

Species of beetle

Acalolepta novaguineae is a species of beetle in the family Cerambycidae. It was described by E. Forrest Gilmour in 1956. It is known from Papua New Guinea.
