= Acalolepta fruhstorferi =

Scientific classification
- Kingdom: Animalia
- Phylum: Arthropoda
- Class: Insecta
- Order: Coleoptera
- Suborder: Polyphaga
- Infraorder: Cucujiformia
- Family: Cerambycidae
- Genus: Acalolepta
- Species: A. fruhstorferi

Binomial name
- Acalolepta fruhstorferi (Breuning, 1960)

Synonyms
- Cypriola fruhstorferi Breuning, 1960

Species of beetle

Acalolepta fruhstorferi is a species of beetle in the family Cerambycidae. It was described by Stephan von Breuning in 1960. It is known from Sumatra.
