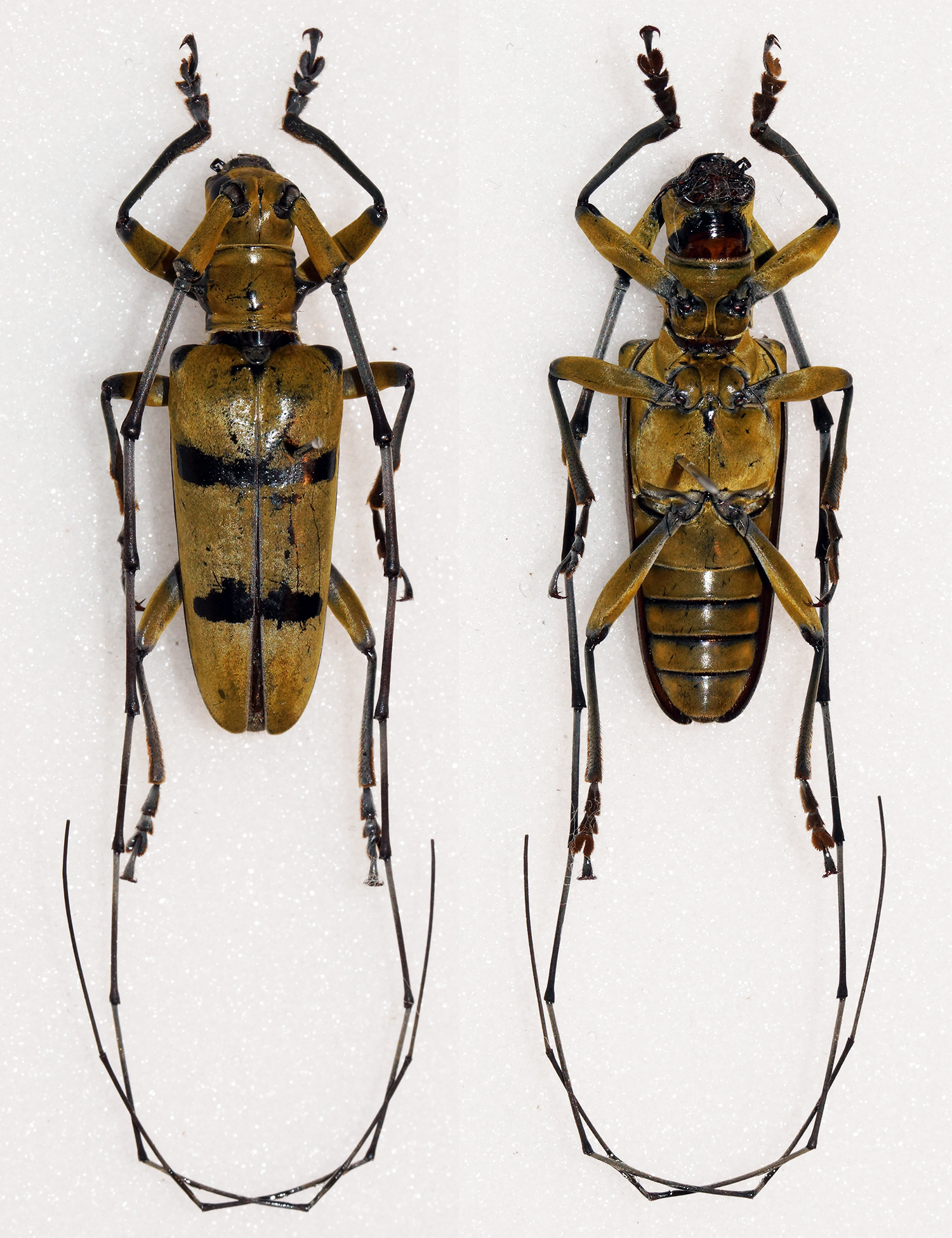

Scientific classification
- Kingdom: Animalia
- Phylum: Arthropoda
- Class: Insecta
- Order: Coleoptera
- Suborder: Polyphaga
- Infraorder: Cucujiformia
- Family: Cerambycidae
- Genus: Acalolepta
- Species: A. bifasciata

Binomial name
- Acalolepta bifasciata Hope, 1833

= Acalolepta bifasciata =

Species of beetle

Acalolepta bifasciata is a species of beetle in the family Cerambycidae.
