= Acalolepta bolanica =

Scientific classification
- Domain: Eukaryota
- Kingdom: Animalia
- Phylum: Arthropoda
- Class: Insecta
- Order: Coleoptera
- Suborder: Polyphaga
- Infraorder: Cucujiformia
- Family: Cerambycidae
- Tribe: Lamiini
- Genus: Acalolepta
- Species: A. bolanica

Binomial name
- Acalolepta bolanica (Aurivillius, 1926)

Synonyms
- Dihammus convexus nodias (Kriesche) Breuning, 1944; Dihammus solatus nodias Kriesche, 1936; Dihammus bolanicus Aurivillius, 1925

Species of beetle

Acalolepta bolanica is a species of beetle in the family Cerambycidae. It was described by Per Olof Christopher Aurivillius in 1926. It is known from Papua New Guinea.
