= Acalolepta vitalisi =

Scientific classification
- Kingdom: Animalia
- Phylum: Arthropoda
- Class: Insecta
- Order: Coleoptera
- Suborder: Polyphaga
- Infraorder: Cucujiformia
- Family: Cerambycidae
- Genus: Acalolepta
- Species: A. vitalisi

Binomial name
- Acalolepta vitalisi (Pic, 1925)

Synonyms
- Dihammus vitalisi (Pic, 1925); Monohammus vitalisi Pic, 1925

Species of beetle

Acalolepta vitalisi is a species of beetle in the family Cerambycidae. It was described by Maurice Pic in 1925. It is known from China, Vietnam, and Cambodia.
