= Acalolepta laevifrons =

Scientific classification
- Kingdom: Animalia
- Phylum: Arthropoda
- Clade: Pancrustacea
- Class: Insecta
- Order: Coleoptera
- Suborder: Polyphaga
- Infraorder: Cucujiformia
- Family: Cerambycidae
- Genus: Acalolepta
- Species: A. laevifrons

Binomial name
- Acalolepta laevifrons (Aurivillius, 1923)

Synonyms
- Dihammus laevifrons Aurivillius, 1923

Species of beetle

Acalolepta laevifrons is a species of longhorn beetle in the family Cerambycidae. It was described by Per Olof Christopher Aurivillius in 1923. It is known from the Philippines, Malaysia, Sumatra, Borneo, and Java.

Specimens have been recorded with sizes ranging from 18mm to 21.5mm.
