= Acalolepta masatakai =

Scientific classification
- Domain: Eukaryota
- Kingdom: Animalia
- Phylum: Arthropoda
- Class: Insecta
- Order: Coleoptera
- Suborder: Polyphaga
- Infraorder: Cucujiformia
- Family: Cerambycidae
- Tribe: Lamiini
- Genus: Acalolepta
- Species: A. masatakai

Binomial name
- Acalolepta masatakai Makihara, 2003

Species of beetle

Acalolepta masatakai is a species of beetle in the family Cerambycidae. It was described by Hiroshi Makihara in 2003. It is known from Japan.
