= Acalolepta montana =

Scientific classification
- Kingdom: Animalia
- Phylum: Arthropoda
- Clade: Pancrustacea
- Class: Insecta
- Order: Coleoptera
- Suborder: Polyphaga
- Infraorder: Cucujiformia
- Family: Cerambycidae
- Genus: Acalolepta
- Species: A. montana

Binomial name
- Acalolepta montana Aurivillius, 1916

Species of beetle

Acalolepta montana is a species of beetle in the family Cerambycidae. It was described by Per Olof Christopher Aurivillius in 1916. It is known from Sulawesi.

== Subspecies ==
- Acalolepta montana floresica Breuning, 1970
- Acalolepta montana montana Aurivillius, 1916
