= Acalolepta grossescapa =

Scientific classification
- Kingdom: Animalia
- Phylum: Arthropoda
- Class: Insecta
- Order: Coleoptera
- Suborder: Polyphaga
- Infraorder: Cucujiformia
- Family: Cerambycidae
- Genus: Acalolepta
- Species: A. grossescapa

Binomial name
- Acalolepta grossescapa (Breuning, 1942)

Synonyms
- Dihammus grossescapus Breuning, 1942; Acalolepta grossescapus (Breuning, 1942)

Species of beetle

Acalolepta grossescapa is a species of beetle in the family Cerambycidae. It was described by Stephan von Breuning in 1942. It is endemic to Taiwan.
