= Acalolepta chinensis =

Scientific classification
- Kingdom: Animalia
- Phylum: Arthropoda
- Class: Insecta
- Order: Coleoptera
- Suborder: Polyphaga
- Infraorder: Cucujiformia
- Family: Cerambycidae
- Genus: Acalolepta
- Species: A. chinensis

Binomial name
- Acalolepta chinensis Breuning, 1970

Species of beetle

Acalolepta chinensis is a species of beetle in the family Cerambycidae. It was described by Stephan von Breuning in 1970. It is known from China.
