= Acalolepta griseofumata =

Scientific classification
- Domain: Eukaryota
- Kingdom: Animalia
- Phylum: Arthropoda
- Class: Insecta
- Order: Coleoptera
- Suborder: Polyphaga
- Infraorder: Cucujiformia
- Family: Cerambycidae
- Tribe: Lamiini
- Genus: Acalolepta
- Species: A. griseofumata

Binomial name
- Acalolepta griseofumata (Gressitt, 1952)

Synonyms
- Acalolepta trigona (Gressitt) Bigger & Schoefild, 1983; Dihammus griseofumatus Gressitt, 1952; Dihammus trigonus Gressitt, 1952

Species of beetle

Acalolepta griseofumata is a species of beetle in the family Cerambycidae. It was described by Gressitt in 1952, originally under the genus Dihammus. It is known from the Solomon Islands.
