= Acalolepta paracervina =

Scientific classification
- Kingdom: Animalia
- Phylum: Arthropoda
- Class: Insecta
- Order: Coleoptera
- Suborder: Polyphaga
- Infraorder: Cucujiformia
- Family: Cerambycidae
- Genus: Acalolepta
- Species: A. paracervina

Binomial name
- Acalolepta paracervina Breuning, 1972

Species of beetle

Acalolepta paracervina is a species of beetle in the family Cerambycidae. It was described by Stephan von Breuning in 1972. It is known from Vietnam.
