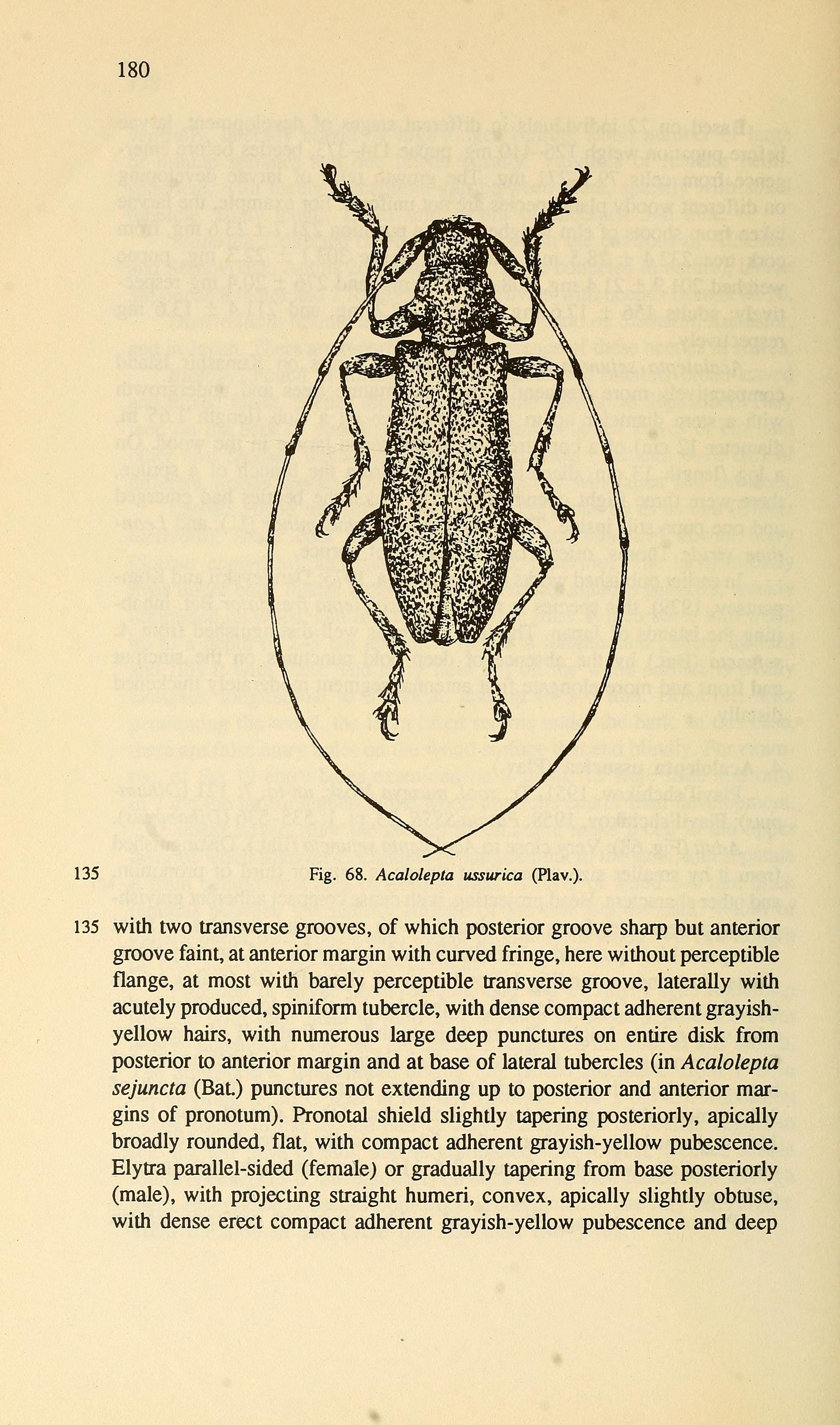
- Acalolepta ussurica(Plav.), Species of beetle

Scientific classification
- Domain: Eukaryota
- Kingdom: Animalia
- Phylum: Arthropoda
- Class: Insecta
- Order: Coleoptera
- Suborder: Polyphaga
- Infraorder: Cucujiformia
- Family: Cerambycidae
- Genus: Acalolepta
- Species: A. ussurica

Binomial name
- Acalolepta ussurica Plavilstshikov, 1951

Synonyms
- Acalolepta ussuriensis (Plavilstshikov, 1954)

= Acalolepta ussurica =

Species of beetle

Acalolepta ussurica is a species of beetle in the family Cerambycidae. It was described by Nikolay Nikolaevich Plavilstshchikov in 1951. It is known from Russia and Siberia.
