= Acalolepta pseudotincturata =

Scientific classification
- Kingdom: Animalia
- Phylum: Arthropoda
- Class: Insecta
- Order: Coleoptera
- Suborder: Polyphaga
- Infraorder: Cucujiformia
- Family: Cerambycidae
- Genus: Acalolepta
- Species: A. pseudotincturata

Binomial name
- Acalolepta pseudotincturata (Breuning, 1935)

Synonyms
- Dihammus pseudotincturatus Breuning, 1935

Species of beetle

Acalolepta pseudotincturata is a species of beetle in the family Cerambycidae. It was described by Stephan von Breuning in 1935. It is known from Papua New Guinea.
