= Acalolepta blairi =

Scientific classification
- Kingdom: Animalia
- Phylum: Arthropoda
- Class: Insecta
- Order: Coleoptera
- Suborder: Polyphaga
- Infraorder: Cucujiformia
- Family: Cerambycidae
- Genus: Acalolepta
- Species: A. blairi

Binomial name
- Acalolepta blairi (Breuning, 1935)

Synonyms
- Acalolepta salomonum (Breuning, 1938); Dihammus blairi Breuning, 1935; Dihammus salomonum Breuning, 1938; Dihammus tavura Kriesche, 1936

Species of beetle

Acalolepta blairi is a species of beetle in the family Cerambycidae. It was described by Stephan von Breuning in 1935, originally under the genus Dihammus. It is known from Solomon Islands.
