= Acalolepta sobria =

Scientific classification
- Kingdom: Animalia
- Phylum: Arthropoda
- Class: Insecta
- Order: Coleoptera
- Suborder: Polyphaga
- Infraorder: Cucujiformia
- Family: Cerambycidae
- Genus: Acalolepta
- Species: A. sobria

Binomial name
- Acalolepta sobria (Pascoe, 1858)

Synonyms
- Monohammus sobrius Pascoe, 1858

Species of beetle

Acalolepta sobria is a species of beetle in the family Cerambycidae. It was described by Francis Polkinghorne Pascoe in 1858. It is known from Borneo.
