= Acalolepta brunnea =

Scientific classification
- Kingdom: Animalia
- Phylum: Arthropoda
- Class: Insecta
- Order: Coleoptera
- Suborder: Polyphaga
- Infraorder: Cucujiformia
- Family: Cerambycidae
- Genus: Acalolepta
- Species: A. brunnea

Binomial name
- Acalolepta brunnea (Breuning, 1955)

Synonyms
- Cypriola brunnea Breuning, 1955

Species of beetle

Acalolepta brunnea is a species of beetle in the family Cerambycidae. It was described by Stephan von Breuning in 1955. It is known from Vietnam.
