= Acalolepta malaisei =

Scientific classification
- Kingdom: Animalia
- Phylum: Arthropoda
- Class: Insecta
- Order: Coleoptera
- Suborder: Polyphaga
- Infraorder: Cucujiformia
- Family: Cerambycidae
- Genus: Acalolepta
- Species: A. malaisei

Binomial name
- Acalolepta malaisei (Breuning, 1949)

Synonyms
- Cypriola malaisei Breuning, 1949

Species of beetle

Acalolepta malaisei is a species of beetle in the family Cerambycidae. It was described by Stephan von Breuning in 1949. It is known from Myanmar.
