= Acalolepta paraspeciosa =

Scientific classification
- Kingdom: Animalia
- Phylum: Arthropoda
- Class: Insecta
- Order: Coleoptera
- Suborder: Polyphaga
- Infraorder: Cucujiformia
- Family: Cerambycidae
- Genus: Acalolepta
- Species: A. paraspeciosa

Binomial name
- Acalolepta paraspeciosa Breuning, 1982

Species of beetle

Acalolepta paraspeciosa is a species of beetle in the family Cerambycidae. It was described by Stephan von Breuning in 1982. It is known from Tibet.
