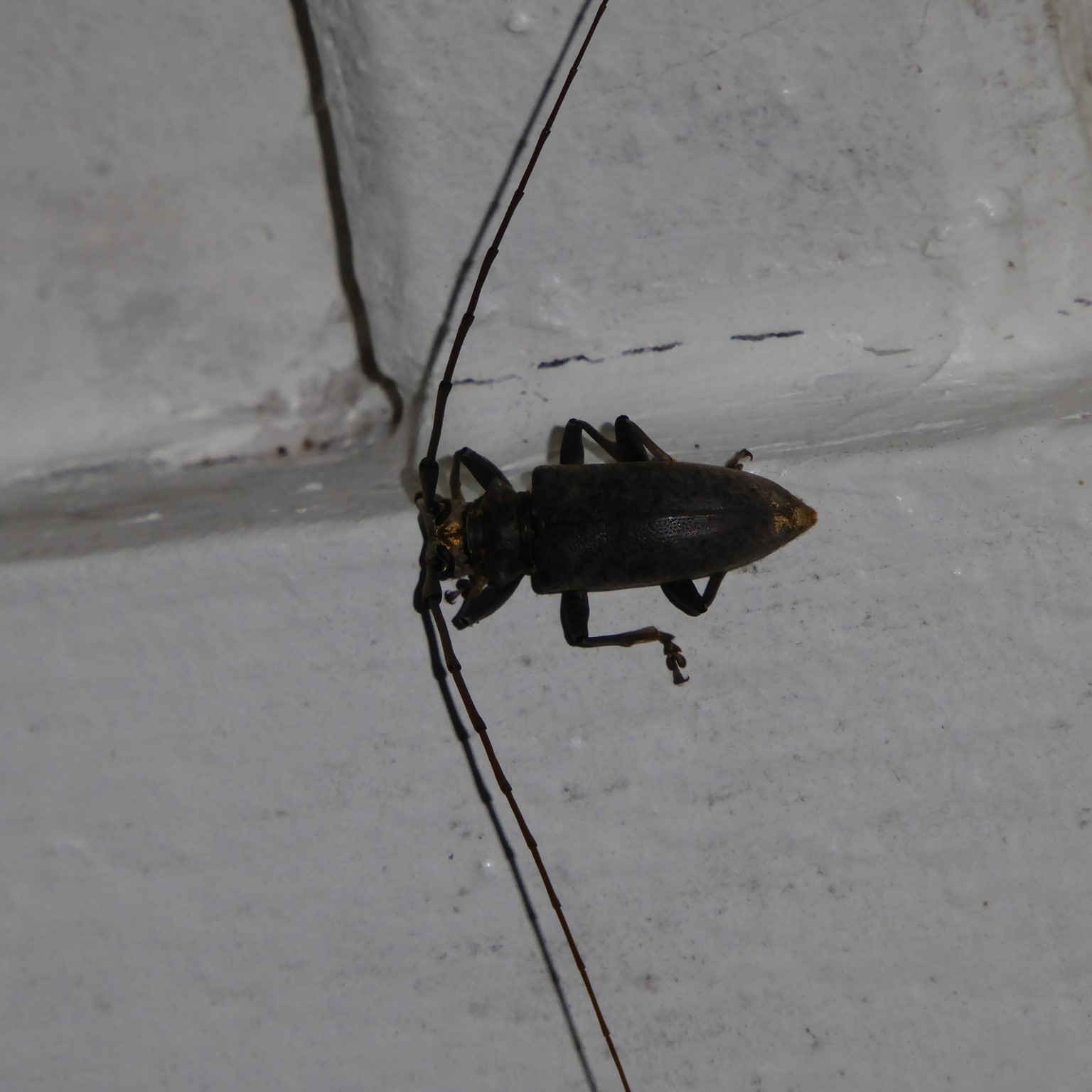

Scientific classification
- Kingdom: Animalia
- Phylum: Arthropoda
- Clade: Pancrustacea
- Class: Insecta
- Order: Coleoptera
- Suborder: Polyphaga
- Infraorder: Cucujiformia
- Family: Cerambycidae
- Genus: Acalolepta
- Species: A. sulcicollis

Binomial name
- Acalolepta sulcicollis (Gressitt, 1952)

Synonyms
- Dihammus sulcicollis Gressitt, 1952

= Acalolepta sulcicollis =

Species of beetle

Acalolepta sulcicollis is a species of beetle in the family Cerambycidae. It was described by Gressitt in 1952. It is known from the Solomon Islands.
