= Acalolepta antenor =

Scientific classification
- Kingdom: Animalia
- Phylum: Arthropoda
- Class: Insecta
- Order: Coleoptera
- Suborder: Polyphaga
- Infraorder: Cucujiformia
- Family: Cerambycidae
- Genus: Acalolepta
- Species: A. antenor

Binomial name
- Acalolepta antenor (Newman, 1842)

Synonyms
- Acalolepta paralumawigi Breuning, 1980; Monochamus anxius Pascoe, 1866; Monohammus antenor Newman, 1842; Monochamus captiosus Pascoe, 1866; Monochamus uraeus Pascoe, 1866

Species of beetle

Acalolepta antenor is a species of beetle in the family Cerambycidae. It was described by Newman in 1842. The typical form is known from the Philippines, but numerous subspecies are widespread in Indonesia, Moluccas, Micronesia, New Guinea, Australia, Solomon Islands and Samoa.
