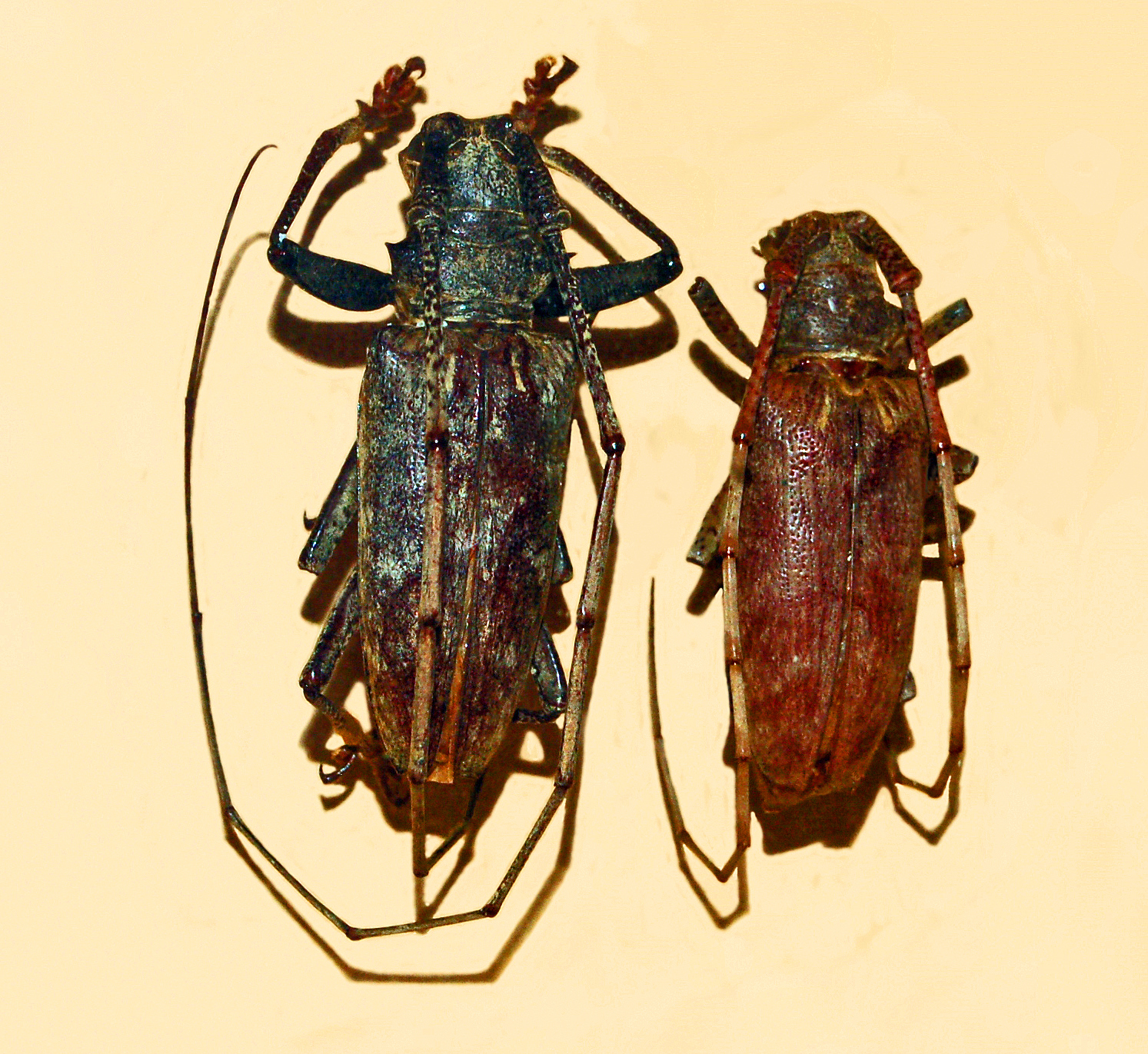
- Acalolepta australis from New Guinea. Male and female

Scientific classification
- Domain: Eukaryota
- Kingdom: Animalia
- Phylum: Arthropoda
- Class: Insecta
- Order: Coleoptera
- Suborder: Polyphaga
- Infraorder: Cucujiformia
- Family: Cerambycidae
- Tribe: Lamiini
- Genus: Acalolepta; Pascoe, 1858

Synonyms
- Astynoscelis Pic, 1905; Dihammus J. Thomson, 1864; Haplohammus Bates, 1884; Neanthes Pascoe, 1878; Niphohammus Matsushita, 1932; Saitoa Matsushita, 1937

= Acalolepta =

Genus of beetles

Acalolepta is a genus of flat-faced longhorns beetle belonging to the family Cerambycidae, subfamily Lamiinae. Its members are found in the Indomalayan realm.

== List of species ==
- Acalolepta admixta (Gahan, 1894)
- Acalolepta aesthetica (Olliff, 1890)
- Acalolepta affinis (Breuning, 1935)
- Acalolepta albosparsuta Breuning, 1964
- Acalolepta alorensis Breuning, 1970
- Acalolepta amamiana (Hayashi, 1962)
- Acalolepta ampliata (Gahan, 1888)
- Acalolepta andamanensis (Breuning, 1953)
- Acalolepta andamanica (Breuning, 1935)
- Acalolepta annamensis (Breuning, 1958)
- Acalolepta antenor (Newman, 1842)
- Acalolepta argentata (Aurivillius, 1911)
- Acalolepta arrowi (Breuning, 1935)
- Acalolepta artensis (Montrouzier, 1861)
- Acalolepta artia (Olliff, 1890)
- Acalolepta atra (Fisher, 1935)
- Acalolepta atroolivacea (Gilmour, 1956)
- Acalolepta aurata (Gahan, 1888)
- Acalolepta aureofusca (Aurivillius, 1917)
- Acalolepta aureosericea (Breuning, 1936)
- Acalolepta australis (Boisduval, 1835)
- Acalolepta basicornis (Gahan, 1895)
- Acalolepta basigranulata (Breuning, 1954)
- Acalolepta basimaculata (Pic, 1944)
- Acalolepta basiplagiata (Breuning, 1935)
- Acalolepta battonii Breuning, 1980
- Acalolepta bennigseni (Aurivillius, 1908)
- Acalolepta bicolor (Breuning, 1935)
- Acalolepta bifasciata (Westwood, 1848)
- Acalolepta biocellata Breuning, 1935
- Acalolepta birmana (Breuning, 1936)
- Acalolepta bisericans (Kriesche, 1936)
- Acalolepta blairi (Breuning, 1935)
- Acalolepta bolanica (Aurivillius, 1926)
- Acalolepta boninensis Hayashi, 1971
- Acalolepta borneensis (Breuning, 1935)
- Acalolepta breuningi (Gressitt, 1951)
- Acalolepta brunnea (Breuning, 1955)
- Acalolepta bryanti (Breuning, 1938)
- Acalolepta buruana Breuning, 1970 inq.
- Acalolepta buruensis (Breuning, 1935)
- Acalolepta capitosa Pascoe, 1866
- Acalolepta celebensis (Breuning, 1935)
- Acalolepta cervina (Hope, 1831)
- Acalolepta chinensis Breuning, 1970
- Acalolepta convexa (Pascoe, 1866)
- Acalolepta coreanica (Breuning, 1956)
- Acalolepta corpulenta (Breuning, 1935)
- Acalolepta crassepunctiformis (Breuning, 1960)
- Acalolepta dayremi (Breuning, 1936)
- Acalolepta defectrix (Pascoe, 1866)
- Acalolepta degener (Bates, 1873)
- Acalolepta degeneroides (Breuning, 1948)
- Acalolepta densefuscomarmorata Breuning, 1982
- Acalolepta densemarmorata Breuning, 1970
- Acalolepta densepunctata (Breuning, 1936)
- Acalolepta dentifera (Aurivillius, 1927)
- Acalolepta dentiferoides (Breuning, 1936)
- Acalolepta dispar (Pascoe, 1866)
- Acalolepta elongata (Breuning, 1935)
- Acalolepta fasciata (Montrouzier, 1855)
- Acalolepta fergussoni Breuning, 1970
- Acalolepta ferriei (Breuning, 1952)
- Acalolepta flavithorax (Breuning, 1936)
- Acalolepta flavomarmorata (Breuning, 1936)
- Acalolepta flocculata (Gressitt, 1935)
- Acalolepta florensis Breuning, 1970
- Acalolepta formosana (Breuning, 1935)
- Acalolepta fraudatrix (Bates, 1873)
- Acalolepta freudei Heyrovský, 1976
- Acalolepta fruhstorferi (Breuning, 1960)
- Acalolepta fulvicornis (Pascoe, 1875)
- Acalolepta fulvoscutellata (Breuning, 1935)
- Acalolepta fuscomarmorata (Breuning, 1940)
- Acalolepta fuscopunctata (Aurivillius, 1927)
- Acalolepta fuscosericea (Schwarzer, 1931)
- Acalolepta fuscosparsuta (Breuning, 1953)
- Acalolepta gardneri (Breuning, 1938)
- Acalolepta ginkgovora Makihara, 1992
- Acalolepta gracilis (Breuning, 1938)
- Acalolepta grisea (Breuning, 1935)
- Acalolepta griseipennis (Thomson, 1857)
- Acalolepta griseofasciata (Breuning, 1935)
- Acalolepta griseofumata (Gressitt, 1952)
- Acalolepta griseomicans (Breuning, 1942)
- Acalolepta griseoplagiata (Breuning, 1935)
- Acalolepta griseoplagiatoides Breuning, 1968
- Acalolepta griseovaria Breuning, 1963
- Acalolepta grisescens (Breuning, 1936)
- Acalolepta grossescapus (Breuning, 1942)
- Acalolepta hainana (Breuning, 1959)
- Acalolepta hebridarum (Breuning, 1935)
- Acalolepta hepatica (Pascoe, 1866)
- Acalolepta hingstoni (Gilmour, 1956)
- Acalolepta holonigra Breuning, 1980 inq.
- Acalolepta holosericea (Breuning, 1939)
- Acalolepta holotephra (Boisduval, 1835)
- Acalolepta impuncticollis Breuning, 1970
- Acalolepta inaequalis (Gardner, 1937)
- Acalolepta indica (Breuning, 1935)
- Acalolepta infasciata Breuning, 1978
- Acalolepta insularis (Breuning, 1939)
- Acalolepta ishigakiana Breuning & Villiers, 1973
- Acalolepta itzingeri (Breuning, 1935)
- Acalolepta iwahashii Makihara, 1992
- Acalolepta javanica (Breuning, 1935)
- Acalolepta kaszabi (Breuning, 1953)
- Acalolepta korolensis (Matsushita, 1932)
- Acalolepta kusamai Hayashi, 1969
- Acalolepta laeviceps (Breuning, 1938)
- Acalolepta laevicollis Breuning, 1964
- Acalolepta laevifrons (Aurivillius, 1923)
- Acalolepta lessonii (Montrouzier, 1855)
- Acalolepta lineata (Breuning, 1939)
- Acalolepta litigiosa (Pascoe, 1866)
- Acalolepta longicollis (Gilmour, 1956)
- Acalolepta longipennis (Gahan, 1894)
- Acalolepta longiscapus (Gahan, 1894)
- Acalolepta loriai (Breuning, 1950)
- Acalolepta luxuriosa (Bates, 1873)
- Acalolepta luzonica (Breuning, 1935)
- Acalolepta macrophthalma (Breuning, 1958)
- Acalolepta magnetica (Pascoe, 1866)
- Acalolepta malaccensis (Breuning, 1936)
- Acalolepta malaisei (Breuning, 1949)
- Acalolepta marianarum (Aurivillius, 1908)
- Acalolepta marmorata (Fisher, 1935)
- Acalolepta marshalli (Breuning, 1935)
- Acalolepta marshalliana (Breuning, 1935)
- Acalolepta masatakai Makihara, 2003
- Acalolepta mausoni (Breuning, 1954)
- Acalolepta meeki Breuning, 1982
- Acalolepta microspinicollis (Breuning, 1961)
- Acalolepta minima (Breuning, 1939)
- Acalolepta misella (Breuning, 1936)
- Acalolepta mixta (Hope, 1841)
- Acalolepta montana Aurivillius, 1916
- Acalolepta mutans (Breuning, 1938)
- Acalolepta nagporensis Breuning, 1982
- Acalolepta nana (Hua, 2002)
- Acalolepta nativitatis (Gahan, 1888)
- Acalolepta neopommeriana (Breuning, 1938)
- Acalolepta niasana Breuning, 1969
- Acalolepta niasensis Breuning, 1974
- Acalolepta niasica Breuning, 1969
- Acalolepta nishimurai Makihara, 1992
- Acalolepta nivosa (White, 1858)
- Acalolepta noctis Goussey, 2007
- Acalolepta novaguineae (Gilmour, 1956)
- Acalolepta ochreifrons Breuning, 1974
- Acalolepta olivacea (Breuning, 1944)
- Acalolepta opposita (Pascoe, 1866)
- Acalolepta oshimana (Breuning, 1954)
- Acalolepta ovina (Pascoe, 1863)
- Acalolepta pallens (Breuning, 1938)
- Acalolepta papuana (Breuning, 1939)
- Acalolepta parabolanica Breuning, 1980
- Acalolepta paracervina Breuning, 1972
- Acalolepta paraspeciosa Breuning, 1982
- Acalolepta permutans (Pascoe, 1857)
- Acalolepta persimilis (Gahan, 1907)
- Acalolepta pici (Breuning, 1935)
- Acalolepta pleuralis (Schwarzer, 1930)
- Acalolepta pontianakensis (Breuning, 1958)
- Acalolepta producta (Pascoe, 1866)
- Acalolepta proxima (Breuning, 1935)
- Acalolepta pseudaurata (Breuning, 1936)
- Acalolepta pseudoconvexa (Breuning, 1936)
- Acalolepta pseudodentifera (Breuning, 1942)
- Acalolepta pseudomarmorata (Breuning, 1944)
- Acalolepta pseudoproducta (Breuning, 1936)
- Acalolepta pseudosericans (Breuning, 1949)
- Acalolepta pseudospeciosa Breuning, 1964
- Acalolepta pseudotincturata (Breuning, 1935)
- Acalolepta puncticeps (Breuning, 1938)
- Acalolepta punctifrons (Gahan, 1894)
- Acalolepta pusio Pascoe, 1858
- Acalolepta riouensis (Aurivillius, 1924)
- Acalolepta romblonica Hüdepohl, 1992
- Acalolepta rotundipennis (Breuning, 1942) inq.
- Acalolepta rusticatrix (Fabricius, 1801)
- Acalolepta saintaignani Breuning, 1982
- Acalolepta samarensis (Aurivillius, 1927)
- Acalolepta satoi Breuning & Ohbayashi, 1966
- Acalolepta scotti (Breuning, 1936)
- Acalolepta sculpturata (Aurivillius, 1924)
- Acalolepta sejuncta Bates, 1873
- Acalolepta semisericea (Pic, 1935)
- Acalolepta sericans (Breuning, 1938)
- Acalolepta sericea (Breuning, 1935)
- Acalolepta sericeiceps (Kriesche, 1936)
- Acalolepta sericeipennis Breuning, 1964
- Acalolepta sericeomicans (Fairmaire, 1889)
- Acalolepta sikkimensis (Breuning, 1935)
- Acalolepta similis (Breuning, 1938)
- Acalolepta simillima Breuning & Ohbayashi, 1966
- Acalolepta siporensis (Breuning, 1939)
- Acalolepta sobria (Pascoe, 1858)
- Acalolepta socia (Gahan, 1888)
- Acalolepta soembana Breuning, 1970
- Acalolepta solata (Pascoe, 1866)
- Acalolepta sondaica (Breuning, 1935)
- Acalolepta speciosa (Gahan, 1888)
- Acalolepta stictica (Breuning, 1948)
- Acalolepta strandi (Breuning, 1935)
- Acalolepta strandiella (Breuning, 1935)
- Acalolepta subaequalis Breuning, 1964
- Acalolepta subaurata (Schwarzer, 1931)
- Acalolepta subbasicornis (Breuning, 1960)
- Acalolepta subbicolor (Breuning, 1954)
- Acalolepta sublusca (Thomson, 1857)
- Acalolepta submaculata (Gilmour, 1947)
- Acalolepta subpustulata (Breuning, 1960)
- Acalolepta subsulphurifer Breuning, 1964
- Acalolepta subtruncata (Breuning, 1938)
- Acalolepta subunicolor Breuning, 1964
- Acalolepta sulcicollis (Gressitt, 1952)
- Acalolepta sulphurifera (Hope, 1842)
- Acalolepta sumatrana (Breuning, 1940)
- Acalolepta sumatrensis (Breuning, 1936)
- Acalolepta szechuana (Gressitt, 1938)
- Acalolepta tarsalis (Pascoe, 1866)
- Acalolepta tenasserimensis (Breuning, 1960)
- Acalolepta tenuipes (Breuning, 1939)
- Acalolepta tenuis (Breuning, 1936)
- Acalolepta ternatensis (Breuning, 1936)
- Acalolepta timorensis (Breuning, 1935)
- Acalolepta timorlautensis (Breuning, 1935)
- Acalolepta tincturata (Pascoe, 1866)
- Acalolepta trucana (Kriesche, 1936)
- Acalolepta truncata (Breuning, 1938)
- Acalolepta tugelensis Breuning, 1970 inq.
- Acalolepta unicolor (Fisher, 1935)
- Acalolepta uniformis (Breuning, 1935)
- Acalolepta ussurica Plavilstshikov, 1951
- Acalolepta variolaris (Pascoe, 1866)
- Acalolepta vastator (Newman, 1847) - Passion Vine Longicorn
- Acalolepta viridimicans (Breuning, 1935)
- Acalolepta vitalisi (Pic, 1925)
- Acalolepta whiteheadi Breuning, 1970
- Acalolepta wittmeri Breuning, 1975
- Acalolepta woodlarkiana (Breuning, 1935)
- Acalolepta woodlarkiensis Breuning, 1970
- Acalolepta y-signata (Gilmour, 1956)

Since transferred:

- Acalolepta cariosa (Pascoe, 1866)
- Acalolepta flavidosignata (Aurivillius, 1927)
- Acalolepta puncticollis (Fisher, 1935)

Dubious

- "Acalolepta flavosignata Aurivillius, 1927". Unknown. Potentially an unjustified misspelling of Acalolepta flavidosignata (Aurivillius, 1927)
