= Acalolepta bisericans =

Scientific classification
- Domain: Eukaryota
- Kingdom: Animalia
- Phylum: Arthropoda
- Class: Insecta
- Order: Coleoptera
- Suborder: Polyphaga
- Infraorder: Cucujiformia
- Family: Cerambycidae
- Tribe: Lamiini
- Genus: Acalolepta
- Species: A. bisericans

Binomial name
- Acalolepta bisericans (Kriesche, 1936)

Species of beetle

Acalolepta bisericans is a species of beetle in the family Cerambycidae. It was described by Kriesche in 1936. It is known from the Solomon Islands.
