= Acalolepta szechuana =

Scientific classification
- Domain: Eukaryota
- Kingdom: Animalia
- Phylum: Arthropoda
- Class: Insecta
- Order: Coleoptera
- Suborder: Polyphaga
- Infraorder: Cucujiformia
- Family: Cerambycidae
- Tribe: Lamiini
- Genus: Acalolepta
- Species: A. szechuana

Binomial name
- Acalolepta szechuana (Gressitt, 1938)

Species of beetle

Acalolepta szechuana is a species of beetle in the family Cerambycidae. It was described by Gressitt in 1938. It is known from China.
