= Acalolepta producta =

Scientific classification
- Kingdom: Animalia
- Phylum: Arthropoda
- Class: Insecta
- Order: Coleoptera
- Suborder: Polyphaga
- Infraorder: Cucujiformia
- Family: Cerambycidae
- Genus: Acalolepta
- Species: A. producta

Binomial name
- Acalolepta producta (Pascoe, 1866)

Synonyms
- Dihammus productus (Pascoe) Aurivillius, 1922; Monochamus productus Pascoe, 1866; ?Dihammus hepaticus (Pascoe) Breuning, 1944

Species of beetle

Acalolepta producta is a species of beetle in the family Cerambycidae. It was described by Francis Polkinghorne Pascoe in 1866. It is known from Moluccas.
