= Acalolepta flocculata =

Scientific classification
- Domain: Eukaryota
- Kingdom: Animalia
- Phylum: Arthropoda
- Class: Insecta
- Order: Coleoptera
- Suborder: Polyphaga
- Infraorder: Cucujiformia
- Family: Cerambycidae
- Tribe: Lamiini
- Genus: Acalolepta
- Species: A. flocculata

Binomial name
- Acalolepta flocculata (Gressitt, 1935)

Synonyms
- Monochamus flocculatus Gressitt, 1935

Species of beetle

Acalolepta flocculata is a species of beetle in the family Cerambycidae. It was described by Gressitt in 1935. It is known from Taiwan and China.

== Subspecies ==
- Acalolepta flocculata flocculata (Gressitt, 1935)
- Acalolepta flocculata paucisetosa (Gressitt, 1938)
