= Acalolepta flavosignata =

Scientific classification
- Domain: Eukaryota
- Kingdom: Animalia
- Phylum: Arthropoda
- Class: Insecta
- Order: Coleoptera
- Suborder: Polyphaga
- Infraorder: Cucujiformia
- Family: Cerambycidae
- Tribe: Lamiini
- Genus: Acalolepta
- Species: A. flavosignata

Binomial name
- Acalolepta flavosignata Aurivillius, 1927

Species of beetle

Acalolepta flavosignata is a species of beetle in the family Cerambycidae. It was described by Per Olof Christopher Aurivillius in 1927.
