= Acalolepta bennigseni =

Scientific classification
- Domain: Eukaryota
- Kingdom: Animalia
- Phylum: Arthropoda
- Class: Insecta
- Order: Coleoptera
- Suborder: Polyphaga
- Infraorder: Cucujiformia
- Family: Cerambycidae
- Tribe: Lamiini
- Genus: Acalolepta
- Species: A. bennigseni

Binomial name
- Acalolepta bennigseni (Aurivillius, 1908)

Synonyms
- Monochamus bennigseni Aurivillius, 1908

Species of beetle

Acalolepta bennigseni is a species of beetle in the family Cerambycidae. It was described by Per Olof Christopher Aurivillius in 1908. It is known from the Caroline Islands.
