= Acalolepta aureofusca =

Scientific classification
- Domain: Eukaryota
- Kingdom: Animalia
- Phylum: Arthropoda
- Class: Insecta
- Order: Coleoptera
- Suborder: Polyphaga
- Infraorder: Cucujiformia
- Family: Cerambycidae
- Tribe: Lamiini
- Genus: Acalolepta
- Species: A. aureofusca

Binomial name
- Acalolepta aureofusca (Aurivillius, 1917)

Synonyms
- Dihammus aureofuscus (Aurivillius) Aurivillius, 1921; Haplohammus aureofuscus Aurivillius, 1917; Haplohammus fistulator ab. aureofuscus (Aurivillius) Breuning, 1944

Species of beetle

Acalolepta aureofusca is a species of beetle in the family Cerambycidae. It was described by Per Olof Christopher Aurivillius in 1917. It is known to come from Australia.
