= Acalolepta dispar =

Scientific classification
- Kingdom: Animalia
- Phylum: Arthropoda
- Clade: Pancrustacea
- Class: Insecta
- Order: Coleoptera
- Suborder: Polyphaga
- Infraorder: Cucujiformia
- Family: Cerambycidae
- Genus: Acalolepta
- Species: A. dispar

Binomial name
- Acalolepta dispar (Pascoe, 1866)

Synonyms
- Orsidis dispar Pascoe, 1866

Species of beetle

Acalolepta dispar is a species of beetle in the family Cerambycidae. It was described by Francis Polkinghorne Pascoe in 1866. It is known from Borneo, Sumatra, Java and Malaysia.
