= Acalolepta parabolanica =

Scientific classification
- Kingdom: Animalia
- Phylum: Arthropoda
- Class: Insecta
- Order: Coleoptera
- Suborder: Polyphaga
- Infraorder: Cucujiformia
- Family: Cerambycidae
- Genus: Acalolepta
- Species: A. parabolanica

Binomial name
- Acalolepta parabolanica Breuning, 1980

Species of beetle

Acalolepta parabolanica is a species of beetle in the family Cerambycidae. It was described by Stephan von Breuning in 1980. It is known from Papua New Guinea.
