= Acalolepta itzingeri =

Scientific classification
- Kingdom: Animalia
- Phylum: Arthropoda
- Class: Insecta
- Order: Coleoptera
- Suborder: Polyphaga
- Infraorder: Cucujiformia
- Family: Cerambycidae
- Genus: Acalolepta
- Species: A. itzingeri

Binomial name
- Acalolepta itzingeri (Breuning, 1935)

Species of beetle

Acalolepta itzingeri is a species of beetle in the family Cerambycidae. It was described by Stephan von Breuning in 1935.

== Subspecies ==
- Acalolepta itzingeri itzingeri (Breuning, 1935)
- Acalolepta itzingeri rosselli Breuning, 1970
- Acalolepta itzingeri trobriandensis Breuning, 1970
- Acalolepta itzingeri woodlarkiella Breuning, 1970
