= Acalolepta amamiana =

Scientific classification
- Kingdom: Animalia
- Phylum: Arthropoda
- Class: Insecta
- Order: Coleoptera
- Suborder: Polyphaga
- Infraorder: Cucujiformia
- Family: Cerambycidae
- Genus: Acalolepta
- Species: A. amamiana

Binomial name
- Acalolepta amamiana (Hayashi, 1962)

Species of beetle

Acalolepta amamiana is a species of beetle in the family Cerambycidae. It was described by Hayashi in 1962.

== Subspecies ==
- Acalolepta amamiana amamiana (Hayashi, 1962)
- Acalolepta amamiana simillima Breuning & Ohbayashi, 1966
