= Acalolepta laeviceps =

Scientific classification
- Kingdom: Animalia
- Phylum: Arthropoda
- Class: Insecta
- Order: Coleoptera
- Suborder: Polyphaga
- Infraorder: Cucujiformia
- Family: Cerambycidae
- Genus: Acalolepta
- Species: A. laeviceps

Binomial name
- Acalolepta laeviceps (Breuning, 1938)

Synonyms
- Dihammus laeviceps Breuning, 1938

Species of beetle

Acalolepta laeviceps is a species of beetle in the family Cerambycidae. It was described by Stephan von Breuning in 1938. It is found in India.
