= Acalolepta noctis =

Scientific classification
- Domain: Eukaryota
- Kingdom: Animalia
- Phylum: Arthropoda
- Class: Insecta
- Order: Coleoptera
- Suborder: Polyphaga
- Infraorder: Cucujiformia
- Family: Cerambycidae
- Tribe: Lamiini
- Genus: Acalolepta
- Species: A. noctis

Binomial name
- Acalolepta noctis Goussey, 2007

Species of beetle

Acalolepta noctis is a species of beetle in the family Cerambycidae. It was described by Frederik Goussey in 2007. It is known from the Solomon Islands.
