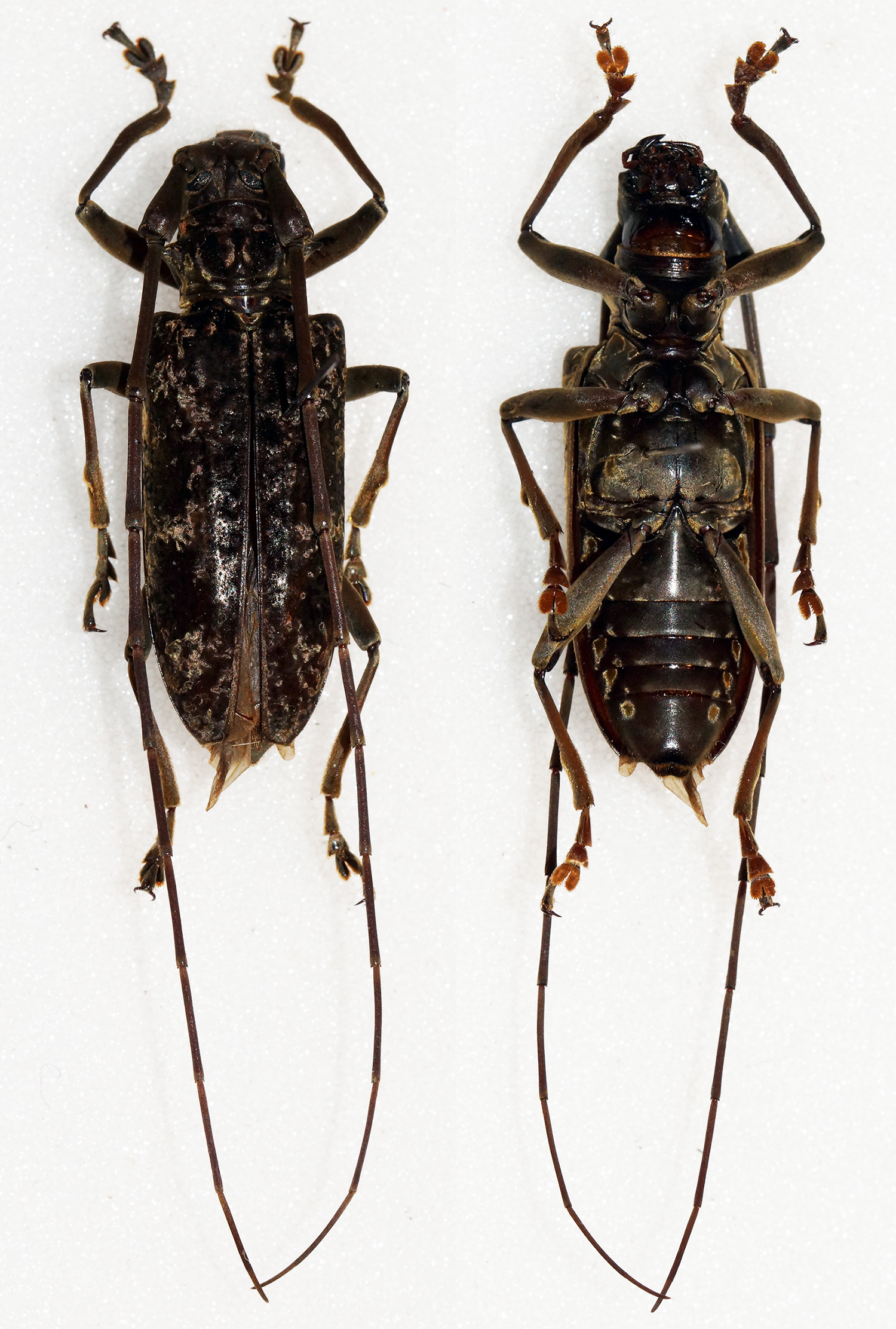

Scientific classification
- Domain: Eukaryota
- Kingdom: Animalia
- Phylum: Arthropoda
- Class: Insecta
- Order: Coleoptera
- Suborder: Polyphaga
- Infraorder: Cucujiformia
- Family: Cerambycidae
- Tribe: Lamiini
- Genus: Acalolepta
- Species: A. fuscosericea

Binomial name
- Acalolepta fuscosericea Schwarzer, 1931

= Acalolepta fuscosericea =

Species of beetle

Acalolepta fuscosericea is a species of beetle in the family Cerambycidae found in Asia in countries such as the Philippines.,
