= Acalolepta capitosa =

Scientific classification
- Domain: Eukaryota
- Kingdom: Animalia
- Phylum: Arthropoda
- Class: Insecta
- Order: Coleoptera
- Suborder: Polyphaga
- Infraorder: Cucujiformia
- Family: Cerambycidae
- Tribe: Lamiini
- Genus: Acalolepta
- Species: A. capitosa

Binomial name
- Acalolepta capitosa Pascoe, 1866

Synonyms
- Dihammus capitosus Pascoe, 1866

Species of beetle

Acalolepta capitosa is a species of beetle in the family Cerambycidae. It was described by Francis Polkinghorne Pascoe in 1866. It is known from Australia.
