= Acalolepta pontianakensis =

Scientific classification
- Kingdom: Animalia
- Phylum: Arthropoda
- Class: Insecta
- Order: Coleoptera
- Suborder: Polyphaga
- Infraorder: Cucujiformia
- Family: Cerambycidae
- Genus: Acalolepta
- Species: A. pontianakensis

Binomial name
- Acalolepta pontianakensis (Breuning, 1958)

Synonyms
- Cypriola pontianakensis Breuning, 1958

Species of beetle

Acalolepta pontianakensis is a species of beetle in the family Cerambycidae. It was described by Stephan von Breuning in 1958. It is known from Borneo.
