= Acalolepta tarsalis =

Scientific classification
- Kingdom: Animalia
- Phylum: Arthropoda
- Clade: Pancrustacea
- Class: Insecta
- Order: Coleoptera
- Suborder: Polyphaga
- Infraorder: Cucujiformia
- Family: Cerambycidae
- Genus: Acalolepta
- Species: A. tarsalis

Binomial name
- Acalolepta tarsalis (Pascoe, 1866)

Synonyms
- Monochamus tarsalis Pascoe, 1866

Species of beetle

Acalolepta tarsalis is a species of beetle in the family Cerambycidae. It was described by Francis Polkinghorne Pascoe in 1866. It is known from Sumatra, Malaysia and Borneo.
