= Acalolepta litigiosa =

Scientific classification
- Domain: Eukaryota
- Kingdom: Animalia
- Phylum: Arthropoda
- Class: Insecta
- Order: Coleoptera
- Suborder: Polyphaga
- Infraorder: Cucujiformia
- Family: Cerambycidae
- Tribe: Lamiini
- Genus: Acalolepta
- Species: A. litigiosa

Binomial name
- Acalolepta litigiosa (Pascoe, 1866)

Species of beetle

Acalolepta litigiosa is a species of beetle in the family Cerambycidae. It was described by Francis Polkinghorne Pascoe in 1866. It is known from Indonesia.
