= Acalolepta subaurata =

Scientific classification
- Kingdom: Animalia
- Phylum: Arthropoda
- Class: Insecta
- Order: Coleoptera
- Suborder: Polyphaga
- Infraorder: Cucujiformia
- Family: Cerambycidae
- Genus: Acalolepta
- Species: A. subaurata

Binomial name
- Acalolepta subaurata (Schwarzer, 1931)

Synonyms
- Dihammus subauratus Schwarzer, 1931

Species of beetle

Acalolepta subaurata is a species of beetle in the family Cerambycidae. It was described by Bernhard Schwarzer in 1931. It is known from Borneo.
