= Acalolepta ginkgovora =

Scientific classification
- Domain: Eukaryota
- Kingdom: Animalia
- Phylum: Arthropoda
- Class: Insecta
- Order: Coleoptera
- Suborder: Polyphaga
- Infraorder: Cucujiformia
- Family: Cerambycidae
- Tribe: Lamiini
- Genus: Acalolepta
- Species: A. ginkgovora

Binomial name
- Acalolepta ginkgovora Makihara, 1992

Species of beetle

Acalolepta ginkgovora is a species of beetle in the family Cerambycidae. It was described by Hiroshi Makihara in 1992. It is known from Japan.
