= Acalolepta trucana =

Scientific classification
- Domain: Eukaryota
- Kingdom: Animalia
- Phylum: Arthropoda
- Class: Insecta
- Order: Coleoptera
- Suborder: Polyphaga
- Infraorder: Cucujiformia
- Family: Cerambycidae
- Tribe: Lamiini
- Genus: Acalolepta
- Species: A. trucana

Binomial name
- Acalolepta trucana (Kriesche, 1936)

Synonyms
- Dihammus trucanus Kriesche, 1936

Species of beetle

Acalolepta trucana is a species of beetle in the family Cerambycidae. It was described by Kriesche in 1936. It is known from the Caroline Islands.
