= Acalolepta alorensis =

Scientific classification
- Kingdom: Animalia
- Phylum: Arthropoda
- Class: Insecta
- Order: Coleoptera
- Suborder: Polyphaga
- Infraorder: Cucujiformia
- Family: Cerambycidae
- Genus: Acalolepta
- Species: A. alorensis

Binomial name
- Acalolepta alorensis Breuning, 1970

Species of beetle

Acalolepta alorensis is a species of beetle in the family Cerambycidae. It is a scientific name for a group of Lamiinae - also called flat-faced long-horned beetles. It was described by Stephan von Breuning in 1970. It is known from Indonesia.
