= Acalolepta korolensis =

Scientific classification
- Domain: Eukaryota
- Kingdom: Animalia
- Phylum: Arthropoda
- Class: Insecta
- Order: Coleoptera
- Suborder: Polyphaga
- Infraorder: Cucujiformia
- Family: Cerambycidae
- Tribe: Lamiini
- Genus: Acalolepta
- Species: A. korolensis

Binomial name
- Acalolepta korolensis (Matsushita, 1932)

Synonyms
- Dihammus korolensis (Matsushita) Breuning, 1943; Dihammus lupinus Kriesche, 1936; Niphohammus korolensis Matsushita, 1932

Species of beetle

Acalolepta korolensis is a species of beetle in the family Cerambycidae. It was described by Masaki Matsushita in 1932. It is known from Malaysia.
