= Acalolepta basigranulata =

Scientific classification
- Kingdom: Animalia
- Phylum: Arthropoda
- Class: Insecta
- Order: Coleoptera
- Suborder: Polyphaga
- Infraorder: Cucujiformia
- Family: Cerambycidae
- Genus: Acalolepta
- Species: A. basigranulata

Binomial name
- Acalolepta basigranulata (Breuning, 1954)

Synonyms
- Cypriola basigranulata Breuning, 1954

Species of beetle

Acalolepta basigranulata is a species of beetle in the family Cerambycidae. It was described by Stephan von Breuning in 1954. It is known from India.
