= Acalolepta similis =

Scientific classification
- Kingdom: Animalia
- Phylum: Arthropoda
- Class: Insecta
- Order: Coleoptera
- Suborder: Polyphaga
- Infraorder: Cucujiformia
- Family: Cerambycidae
- Genus: Acalolepta
- Species: A. similis

Binomial name
- Acalolepta similis (Breuning, 1938)

Synonyms
- Dihammus similis Breuning, 1938

Species of beetle

Acalolepta similis is a species of beetle in the family Cerambycidae. It was described by Stephan von Breuning in 1938. It is known from Timor.
