= Acalolepta defectrix =

Scientific classification
- Kingdom: Animalia
- Phylum: Arthropoda
- Clade: Pancrustacea
- Class: Insecta
- Order: Coleoptera
- Suborder: Polyphaga
- Infraorder: Cucujiformia
- Family: Cerambycidae
- Genus: Acalolepta
- Species: A. defectrix

Binomial name
- Acalolepta defectrix (Pascoe, 1866)

Species of beetle

Acalolepta defectrix is a species of beetle in the family Cerambycidae. It was described by Francis Polkinghorne Pascoe in 1866. It is known from Java, Singapore and Malaysia.
