= Acalolepta fulvicornis =

Scientific classification
- Domain: Eukaryota
- Kingdom: Animalia
- Phylum: Arthropoda
- Class: Insecta
- Order: Coleoptera
- Suborder: Polyphaga
- Infraorder: Cucujiformia
- Family: Cerambycidae
- Tribe: Lamiini
- Genus: Acalolepta
- Species: A. fulvicornis

Binomial name
- Acalolepta fulvicornis (Pascoe, 1875)

Synonyms
- Acalolepta fulvicornis fulvicornis (Pascoe, 1875); Monochamus fulvicornis Pascoe, 1875

Species of beetle

Acalolepta fulvicornis is a species of beetle in the family Cerambycidae. It was described by Francis Polkinghorne Pascoe in 1875. It is known from Japan.
