= Acalolepta opposita =

Scientific classification
- Kingdom: Animalia
- Phylum: Arthropoda
- Class: Insecta
- Order: Coleoptera
- Suborder: Polyphaga
- Infraorder: Cucujiformia
- Family: Cerambycidae
- Genus: Acalolepta
- Species: A. opposita

Binomial name
- Acalolepta opposita (Pascoe, 1866)

Synonyms
- Orsidis oppositus Pascoe, 1866

Species of beetle

Acalolepta opposita is a species of beetle in the family Cerambycidae. It was described by Francis Polkinghorne Pascoe in 1866. It is known from Borneo and Malaysia.
