= Acalolepta satoi =

Scientific classification
- Kingdom: Animalia
- Phylum: Arthropoda
- Clade: Pancrustacea
- Class: Insecta
- Order: Coleoptera
- Suborder: Polyphaga
- Infraorder: Cucujiformia
- Family: Cerambycidae
- Genus: Acalolepta
- Species: A. satoi

Binomial name
- Acalolepta satoi Breuning & Ohbayashi, 1966

Species of beetle

Acalolepta satoi is a species of longhorn beetle in the family Cerambycidae. It was described by Stephan von Breuning and Ohbayashi in 1966. It is known from Japan.
