= Acalolepta basimaculata =

Scientific classification
- Kingdom: Animalia
- Phylum: Arthropoda
- Class: Insecta
- Order: Coleoptera
- Suborder: Polyphaga
- Infraorder: Cucujiformia
- Family: Cerambycidae
- Genus: Acalolepta
- Species: A. basimaculata

Binomial name
- Acalolepta basimaculata (Pic, 1944)

Synonyms
- Monochamus basimaculatus Pic, 1944

Species of beetle

Acalolepta basimaculata is a species of beetle in the family Cerambycidae. It was described by Maurice Pic in 1944. It is known from Vietnam.
