= Acalolepta microspinicollis =

Scientific classification
- Kingdom: Animalia
- Phylum: Arthropoda
- Class: Insecta
- Order: Coleoptera
- Suborder: Polyphaga
- Infraorder: Cucujiformia
- Family: Cerambycidae
- Genus: Acalolepta
- Species: A. microspinicollis

Binomial name
- Acalolepta microspinicollis (Breuning, 1961)

Synonyms
- Cypriola microspinicollis Breuning, 1961

Species of beetle

Acalolepta microspinicollis is a species of beetle in the family Cerambycidae. It was described by Stephan von Breuning in 1961. It is known from Vietnam.
