= Acalolepta coreanica =

Scientific classification
- Kingdom: Animalia
- Phylum: Arthropoda
- Class: Insecta
- Order: Coleoptera
- Suborder: Polyphaga
- Infraorder: Cucujiformia
- Family: Cerambycidae
- Genus: Acalolepta
- Species: A. coreanica

Binomial name
- Acalolepta coreanica (Breuning, 1956)

Synonyms
- Cypriola coreanica Breuning, 1956

Species of beetle

Acalolepta coreanica is a species of beetle in the family Cerambycidae. It was described by Stephan von Breuning in 1956. It is known from South Korea.
