= Spotted pine sawyer =

Spotted pine sawyer is a common name for several insects and may refer to:

- Monochamus clamator
- Monochamus maculosus

== See also ==
- Monochamus scutellatus, the white-spotted pine sawyer
