= Acalolepta variolaris =

Scientific classification
- Domain: Eukaryota
- Kingdom: Animalia
- Phylum: Arthropoda
- Class: Insecta
- Order: Coleoptera
- Suborder: Polyphaga
- Infraorder: Cucujiformia
- Family: Cerambycidae
- Tribe: Lamiini
- Genus: Acalolepta
- Species: A. variolaris

Binomial name
- Acalolepta variolaris (Pascoe, 1866)

Synonyms
- Dihammus variolaris (Pascoe) Auctorum; Monochamus variolaris Pascoe, 1866

Species of beetle

Acalolepta variolaris is a species of beetle in the family Cerambycidae. It was described by Francis Polkinghorne Pascoe in 1866, originally under the genus Monochamus. It is known from Papua New Guinea.
