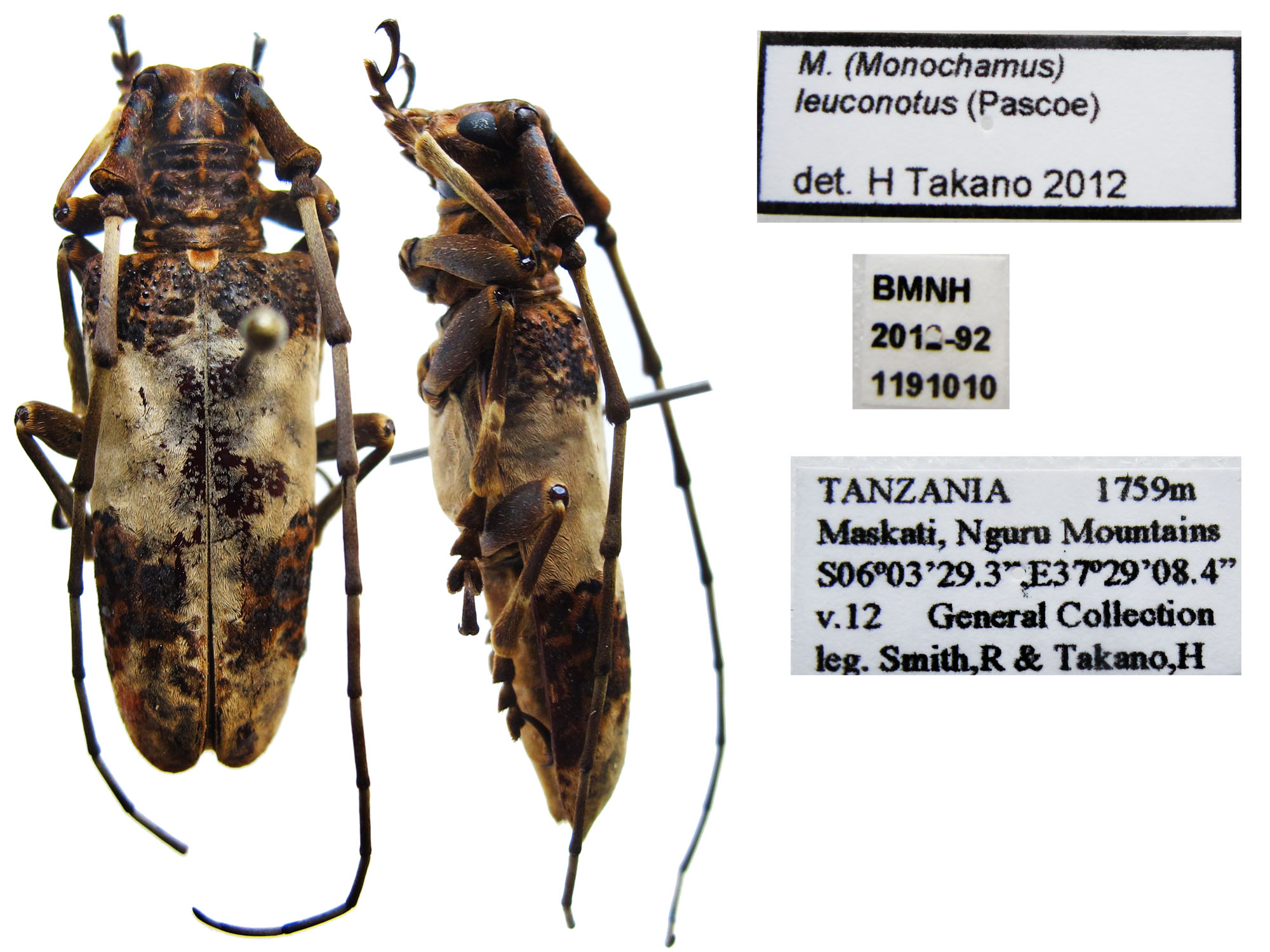

Scientific classification
- Kingdom: Animalia
- Phylum: Arthropoda
- Clade: Pancrustacea
- Class: Insecta
- Order: Coleoptera
- Suborder: Polyphaga
- Infraorder: Cucujiformia
- Family: Cerambycidae
- Genus: Monochamus
- Species: M. leuconotus

Binomial name
- Monochamus leuconotus (Pascoe, 1869)

Synonyms
- Anthores leuconotus Pascoe, 1869; Herpetophygas fasciatus (Fåhraeus) Fåhraeus, 1872; Monohammus leucopterus Heyne-Tasch., 1906; Phygas fasciatus Fåhraeus, 1872

= Monochamus leuconotus =

Species of beetle

Monochamus leuconotus (African white stem borer of coffee) is a species of beetle in the family Cerambycidae. It was described by Francis Polkinghorne Pascoe in 1869, originally under the genus Anthores. It is known from Tanzania, Cameroon, Malawi, Kenya, Mozambique, Namibia, South Africa, Uganda, the Democratic Republic of the Congo, Zambia, Angola, and Zimbabwe. It feeds on Coffea arabica.
