= Acalolepta magnetica =

Scientific classification
- Kingdom: Animalia
- Phylum: Arthropoda
- Class: Insecta
- Order: Coleoptera
- Suborder: Polyphaga
- Infraorder: Cucujiformia
- Family: Cerambycidae
- Genus: Acalolepta
- Species: A. magnetica

Binomial name
- Acalolepta magnetica (Pascoe, 1866)

Synonyms
- Dihammus argutus (Pascoe, 1866); Dihammus magneticus (Pascoe, 1866); Monochamus argutus Pascoe, 1866; Monochamus magneticus Pascoe, 1866; Monochamus viator Pascoe, 1866; Monochamus holotephrus Boisduval, 1835

Species of beetle

Acalolepta magnetica is a species of beetle in the family Cerambycidae. It was described by Francis Polkinghorne Pascoe in 1866, originally under the genus Monochamus. It is known from Micronesia, Moluccas and Indonesia.

== Subspecies ==
- Acalolepta magnetica auripilis (Matsushita, 1935)
- Acalolepta magnetica magnetica (Pascoe, 1866)
