= Acalolepta convexa =

Scientific classification
- Kingdom: Animalia
- Phylum: Arthropoda
- Class: Insecta
- Order: Coleoptera
- Suborder: Polyphaga
- Infraorder: Cucujiformia
- Family: Cerambycidae
- Genus: Acalolepta
- Species: A. convexa

Binomial name
- Acalolepta convexa (Pascoe, 1866)

Synonyms
- Acalolepta convexa convexa (Pascoe); Dihammus convexus (Pascoe) Breuning, 1944; Dihammus convexus convexus (Pascoe) Breuning, 1944; Monohammus convexus Pascoe, 1866

Species of beetle

Acalolepta convexa is a species of beetle in the family Cerambycidae. It was described by Francis Polkinghorne Pascoe in 1866, originally under the genus Monohammus. It is known from Moluccas.
