= Acalolepta ovina =

Scientific classification
- Domain: Eukaryota
- Kingdom: Animalia
- Phylum: Arthropoda
- Class: Insecta
- Order: Coleoptera
- Suborder: Polyphaga
- Infraorder: Cucujiformia
- Family: Cerambycidae
- Tribe: Lamiini
- Genus: Acalolepta
- Species: A. ovina

Binomial name
- Acalolepta ovina (Pascoe, 1863)

Synonyms
- Dihammus frenchi (Blackburn) Aurivillius, 1922; Dihammus ovinus (Pascoe) Aurivillius, 1922; Monochamus frenchi Blackburn, 1891; Monochamus ovinus Pascoe, 1864

Species of beetle

Acalolepta ovina is a species of beetle in the family Cerambycidae. It was described by Francis Polkinghorne Pascoe in 1863, originally under the genus Monochamus. It is known from Australia.
