= Acalolepta artia =

Scientific classification
- Domain: Eukaryota
- Kingdom: Animalia
- Phylum: Arthropoda
- Class: Insecta
- Order: Coleoptera
- Suborder: Polyphaga
- Infraorder: Cucujiformia
- Family: Cerambycidae
- Tribe: Lamiini
- Genus: Acalolepta
- Species: A. artia

Binomial name
- Acalolepta artia (Olliff, 1890)

Synonyms
- Dihammus artius (Olliff, 1890); Monochamus artius Olliff, 1890

Species of beetle

Acalolepta artia is a species of beetle with a bilateral symmetry in the family Cerambycidae. It was described by Olliff in 1890, originally under the genus Monochamus. It is known from Australia.
