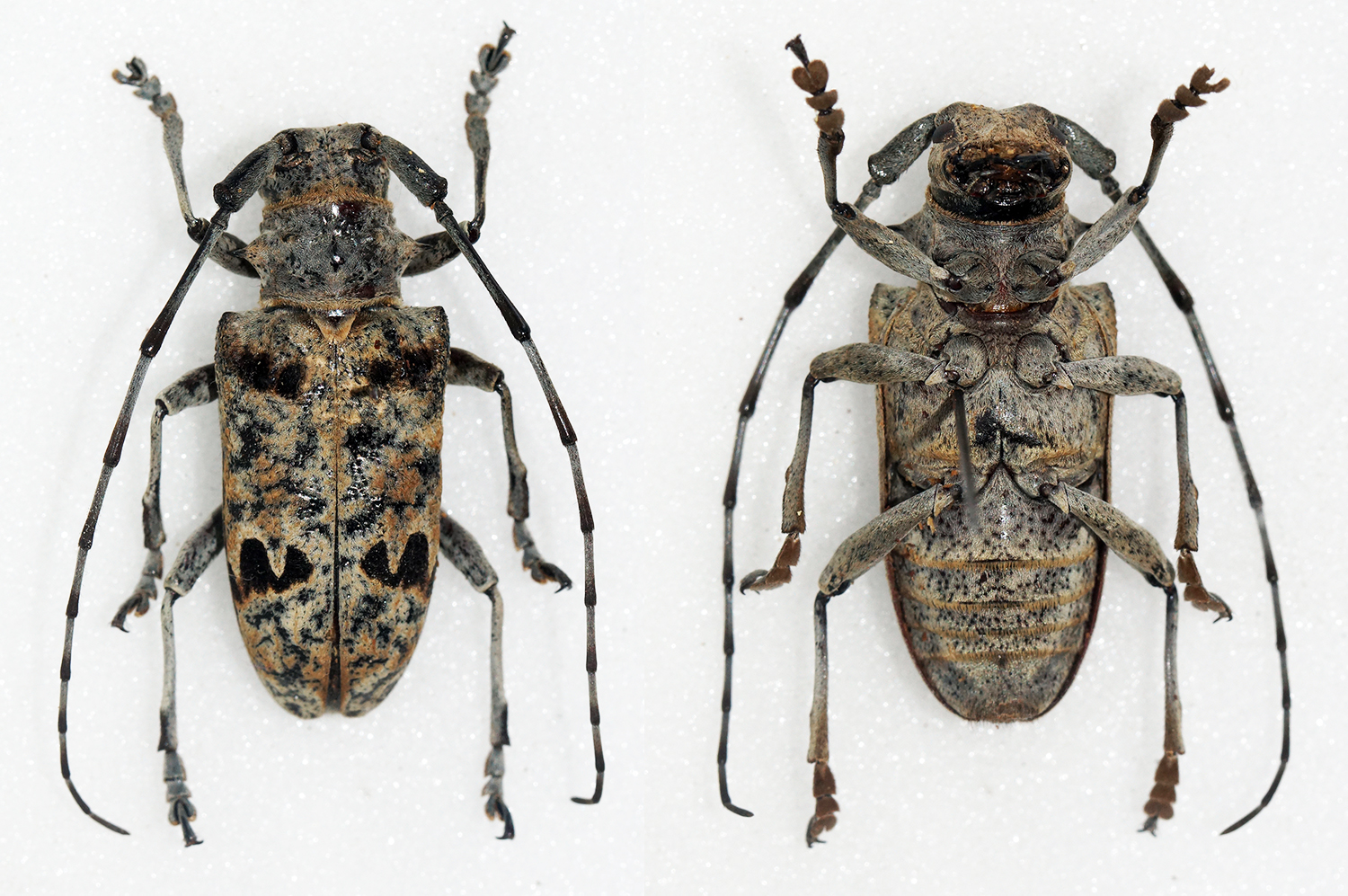

Scientific classification
- Domain: Eukaryota
- Kingdom: Animalia
- Phylum: Arthropoda
- Class: Insecta
- Order: Coleoptera
- Suborder: Polyphaga
- Infraorder: Cucujiformia
- Family: Cerambycidae
- Tribe: Lamiini
- Genus: Monochamus
- Species: M. tridentatus

Binomial name
- Monochamus tridentatus Chevrolat, 1833

Synonyms
- Monochamus tridens Vogt, 1851; Opepharus signator Pascoe, 1868

= Monochamus tridentatus =

Species of beetle

Monochamus tridentatus is a species of beetle in the family Cerambycidae. It was described by Louis Alexandre Auguste Chevrolat in 1833. It is known from Madagascar.
