= Monochamus fisheri =

Scientific classification
- Kingdom: Animalia
- Phylum: Arthropoda
- Class: Insecta
- Order: Coleoptera
- Suborder: Polyphaga
- Infraorder: Cucujiformia
- Family: Cerambycidae
- Genus: Monochamus
- Species: M. fisheri

Binomial name
- Monochamus fisheri Breuning, 1944

Synonyms
- Anhammus variegatus Fisher, 1935

Species of beetle

Monochamus fisheri is a species of beetle in the family Cerambycidae. It was described by Stephan von Breuning in 1944. It is known from Borneo.
