= Monochamus guttulatus =

Scientific classification
- Kingdom: Animalia
- Phylum: Arthropoda
- Class: Insecta
- Order: Coleoptera
- Suborder: Polyphaga
- Infraorder: Cucujiformia
- Family: Cerambycidae
- Genus: Monochamus
- Species: M. guttulatus

Binomial name
- Monochamus guttulatus Gressitt, 1951

Synonyms
- Monochamus guttatus Blessig, 1873

Species of beetle

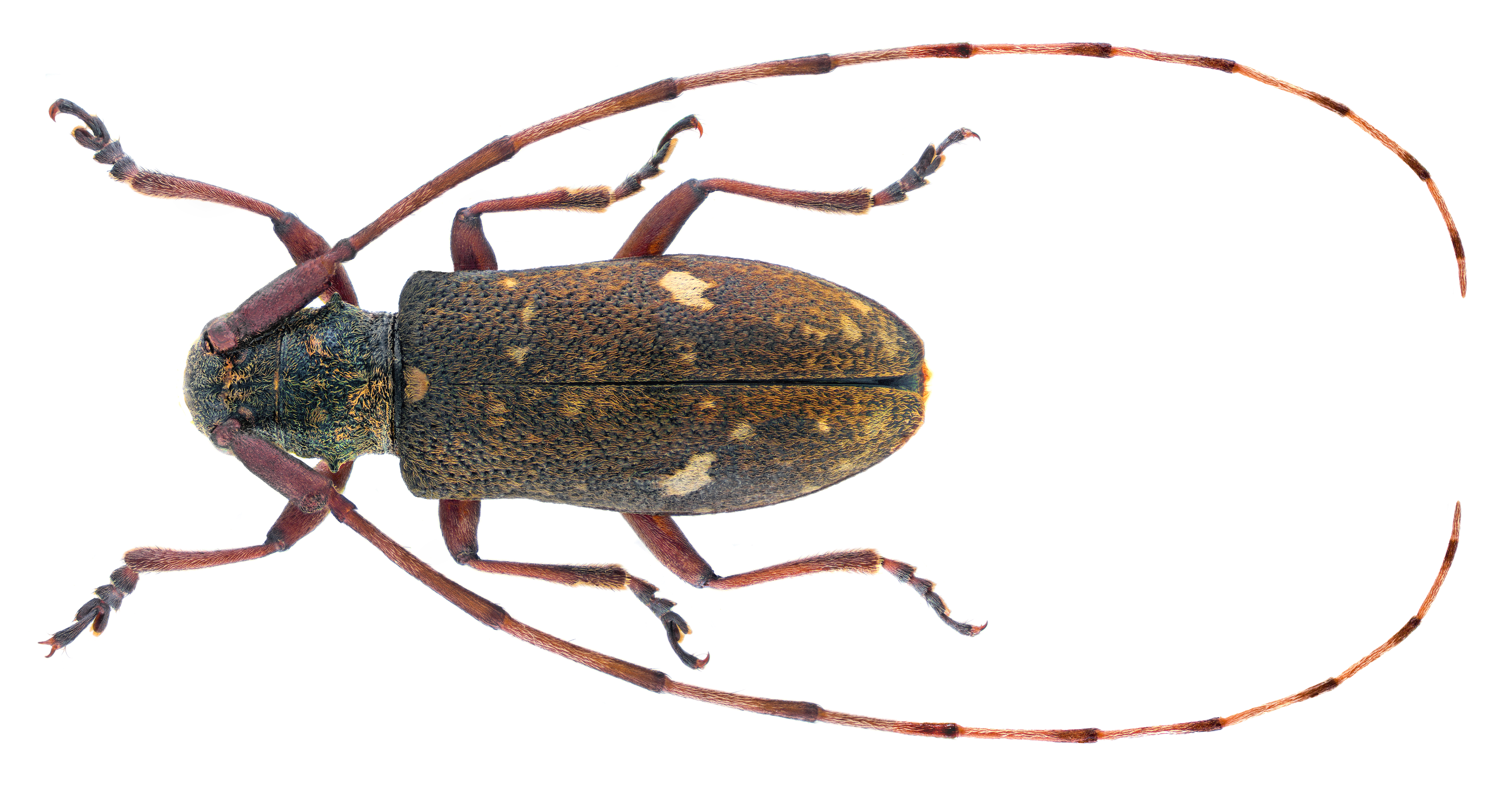
Monochamus guttulatus (Gressitt, 1951). Photograph by U.Schmidt, 2017

Monochamus guttulatus is a species of beetle in the family Cerambycidae. It was described by Gressitt in 1951.
