= Monochamus verticalis =

Scientific classification
- Kingdom: Animalia
- Phylum: Arthropoda
- Class: Insecta
- Order: Coleoptera
- Suborder: Polyphaga
- Infraorder: Cucujiformia
- Family: Cerambycidae
- Genus: Monochamus
- Species: M. verticalis

Binomial name
- Monochamus verticalis (Fairmaire, 1901)

Species of beetle

Monochamus verticalis is a species of beetle in the family Cerambycidae. It was described by Léon Fairmaire in 1901.
