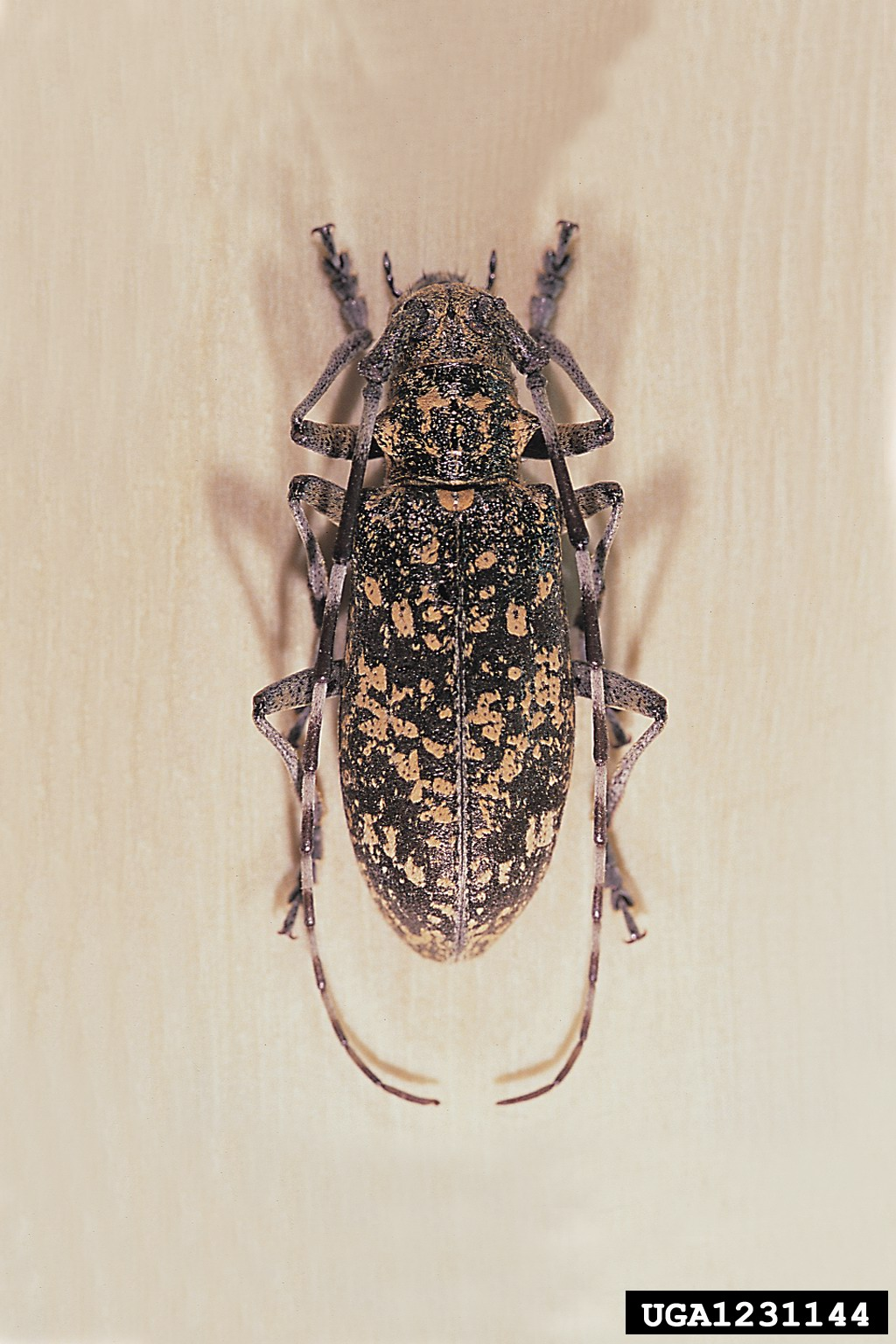

Scientific classification
- Domain: Eukaryota
- Kingdom: Animalia
- Phylum: Arthropoda
- Class: Insecta
- Order: Coleoptera
- Suborder: Polyphaga
- Infraorder: Cucujiformia
- Family: Cerambycidae
- Tribe: Lamiini
- Genus: Monochamus
- Species: M. saltuarius

Binomial name
- Monochamus saltuarius Gebler, 1830

Synonyms
- Monochamus galloprovincialis var. pistor (Germar) Tamanuki, 1933

= Monochamus saltuarius =

Species of beetle

Monochamus saltuarius is a species of beetle in the family Cerambycidae. It was described by Gebler in 1830. It has a wide distribution throughout Europe. It measures between 11 and 19 mm (0.43 and 0.75 in).
