= Monochamus stuhlmanni =

Scientific classification
- Domain: Eukaryota
- Kingdom: Animalia
- Phylum: Arthropoda
- Class: Insecta
- Order: Coleoptera
- Suborder: Polyphaga
- Infraorder: Cucujiformia
- Family: Cerambycidae
- Tribe: Lamiini
- Genus: Monochamus
- Species: M. stuhlmanni

Binomial name
- Monochamus stuhlmanni Kolbe, 1894

Synonyms
- Granulochamus stuhlmanni (Kolbe, 1894); Monochamus allardi Breuning, 1974; Monochamus superbus Breuning, 1935

Species of beetle

Monochamus stuhlmanni is a species of beetle in the family Cerambycidae. It was described by Kolbe in 1894. It is known from Rwanda, the Democratic Republic of the Congo, and Uganda.
