= Monochamus buquetii =

Scientific classification
- Kingdom: Animalia
- Phylum: Arthropoda
- Class: Insecta
- Order: Coleoptera
- Suborder: Polyphaga
- Infraorder: Cucujiformia
- Family: Cerambycidae
- Genus: Monochamus
- Species: M. buquetii

Binomial name
- Monochamus buquetii (Thomson, 1858)

Synonyms
- Homelix buquetii Thomson, 1858

Species of beetle

Monochamus buquetii is a species of beetle in the family Cerambycidae. It was described by James Thomson in 1858.
