= Monochamus murinus =

Scientific classification
- Domain: Eukaryota
- Kingdom: Animalia
- Phylum: Arthropoda
- Class: Insecta
- Order: Coleoptera
- Suborder: Polyphaga
- Infraorder: Cucujiformia
- Family: Cerambycidae
- Tribe: Lamiini
- Genus: Monochamus
- Species: M. murinus

Binomial name
- Monochamus murinus (Gahan, 1888)

Synonyms
- Ethiopiochamus murinus (Gahan) Dillon & Dillon, 1961; Monohammus murinus Gahan, 1888

Species of beetle

Monochamus murinus is a species of beetle in the family Cerambycidae. It was described by Charles Joseph Gahan in 1888. It is known from Senegal and the Ivory Coast.
