= Monochamus masaoi =

Scientific classification
- Domain: Eukaryota
- Kingdom: Animalia
- Phylum: Arthropoda
- Class: Insecta
- Order: Coleoptera
- Suborder: Polyphaga
- Infraorder: Cucujiformia
- Family: Cerambycidae
- Tribe: Lamiini
- Genus: Monochamus
- Species: M. masaoi

Binomial name
- Monochamus masaoi Kusama & Takakuwa, 1984

Species of beetle

Monochamus masaoi is a species of beetle in the family Cerambycidae. It was described by Kusama and Takakuwa in 1984. It is known from Japan.
