= Monochamus karlitzingeri =

Scientific classification
- Domain: Eukaryota
- Kingdom: Animalia
- Phylum: Arthropoda
- Class: Insecta
- Order: Coleoptera
- Suborder: Polyphaga
- Infraorder: Cucujiformia
- Family: Cerambycidae
- Tribe: Lamiini
- Genus: Monochamus
- Species: M. karlitzingeri

Binomial name
- Monochamus karlitzingeri Tavakilian & Jiroux, 2015

Synonyms
- Melanauster itzingeri Breuning, 1938; Monochamus itzingeri (Breuning, 1938) nec Breuning, 1935

Species of beetle

Monochamus karlitzingeri is a species of beetle in the family Cerambycidae. It was described by Tavakilian and Jiroux in 2015. It is known from China.
