= Monochamus tropicalis =

Scientific classification
- Domain: Eukaryota
- Kingdom: Animalia
- Phylum: Arthropoda
- Class: Insecta
- Order: Coleoptera
- Suborder: Polyphaga
- Infraorder: Cucujiformia
- Family: Cerambycidae
- Tribe: Lamiini
- Genus: Monochamus
- Species: M. tropicalis

Binomial name
- Monochamus tropicalis (Dillon & Dillon, 1961)

Synonyms
- Ethiopiochamus tropicalis Dillon & Dillon, 1961

Species of beetle

Monochamus tropicalis is a species of beetle in the family Cerambycidae. It was described by Elizabeth S. Dillon and Lawrence S. Dillon in 1961, originally under the genus Ethiopiochamus.
