= Monochamus variegatus =

Scientific classification
- Domain: Eukaryota
- Kingdom: Animalia
- Phylum: Arthropoda
- Class: Insecta
- Order: Coleoptera
- Suborder: Polyphaga
- Infraorder: Cucujiformia
- Family: Cerambycidae
- Tribe: Lamiini
- Genus: Monochamus
- Species: M. variegatus

Binomial name
- Monochamus variegatus (Aurivillius, 1925)

Synonyms
- Noserocera variegata Aurivillius, 1925

Species of beetle

Monochamus variegatus is a species of beetle in the family Cerambycidae. It was described by Per Olof Christopher Aurivillius in 1925.
