= Monochamus maruokai =

Scientific classification
- Kingdom: Animalia
- Phylum: Arthropoda
- Class: Insecta
- Order: Coleoptera
- Suborder: Polyphaga
- Infraorder: Cucujiformia
- Family: Cerambycidae
- Genus: Monochamus
- Species: M. maruokai

Binomial name
- Monochamus maruokai Hayashi, 1962

Species of beetle

Monochamus maruokai is a species of beetle in the family Cerambycidae. It was described by Masao Hayashi in 1962.
