= Monochamus blairi =

Scientific classification
- Kingdom: Animalia
- Phylum: Arthropoda
- Class: Insecta
- Order: Coleoptera
- Suborder: Polyphaga
- Infraorder: Cucujiformia
- Family: Cerambycidae
- Genus: Monochamus
- Species: M. blairi

Binomial name
- Monochamus blairi (Breuning, 1936)

Synonyms
- Hammoderus blairi Breuning, 1936; Plagiohammus blairi (Breuning, 1936)

Species of beetle

Monochamus blairi is a species of beetle in the family Cerambycidae. It was described by Stephan von Breuning in 1936. They are native to Colombia.
