= Monochamus basigranulatus =

Scientific classification
- Kingdom: Animalia
- Phylum: Arthropoda
- Class: Insecta
- Order: Coleoptera
- Suborder: Polyphaga
- Infraorder: Cucujiformia
- Family: Cerambycidae
- Genus: Monochamus
- Species: M. basigranulatus

Binomial name
- Monochamus basigranulatus Breuning, 1952

Synonyms
- Monochamus subtuberosus Breuning, 1965

Species of beetle

Monochamus basigranulatus is a species of beetle in the family Cerambycidae. It was described by Stephan von Breuning in 1952. It is known from the Democratic Republic of the Congo.
