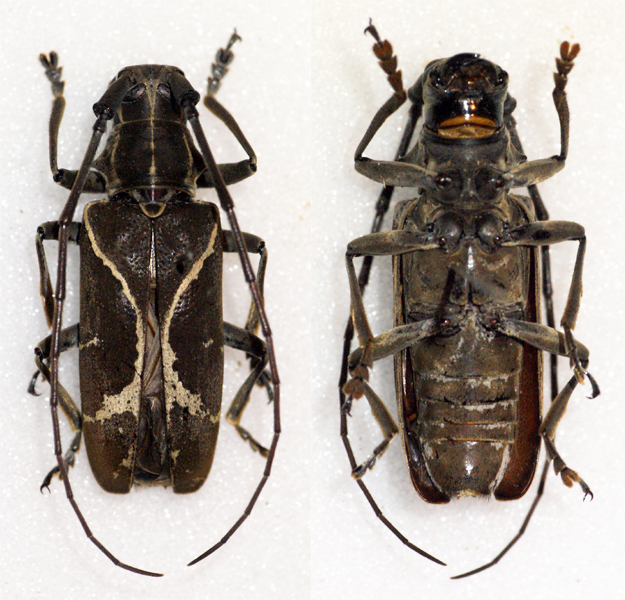

Scientific classification
- Domain: Eukaryota
- Kingdom: Animalia
- Phylum: Arthropoda
- Class: Insecta
- Order: Coleoptera
- Suborder: Polyphaga
- Infraorder: Cucujiformia
- Family: Cerambycidae
- Tribe: Lamiini
- Genus: Monochamus
- Species: M. x-fulvum

Binomial name
- Monochamus x-fulvum (Bates, 1884)

Synonyms
- Laertochamus x-fulvus (Bates) Dillon & Dillon, 1959

= Monochamus x-fulvum =

Species of beetle

Monochamus x-fulvum is a species of beetle in the family Cerambycidae. It was described by Henry Walter Bates in 1884. It has a wide distribution throughout Africa.
