= Monochamus millegranus =

Scientific classification
- Domain: Eukaryota
- Kingdom: Animalia
- Phylum: Arthropoda
- Class: Insecta
- Order: Coleoptera
- Suborder: Polyphaga
- Infraorder: Cucujiformia
- Family: Cerambycidae
- Tribe: Lamiini
- Genus: Monochamus
- Species: M. millegranus

Binomial name
- Monochamus millegranus Bates, 1891

Synonyms
- Monochamus scechenyiana (Frivaldszky, 1892); Monochamus touzalini Pic, 1920; Tibetobia millegrana (Bates, 1891); Tibetobia szechenyana Frivaldszky, 1892

Species of beetle

Monochamus millegranus is a species of beetle in the family Cerambycidae. It was described by Henry Walter Bates in 1891. It is known from China. It feeds on Castanea mollissima.
