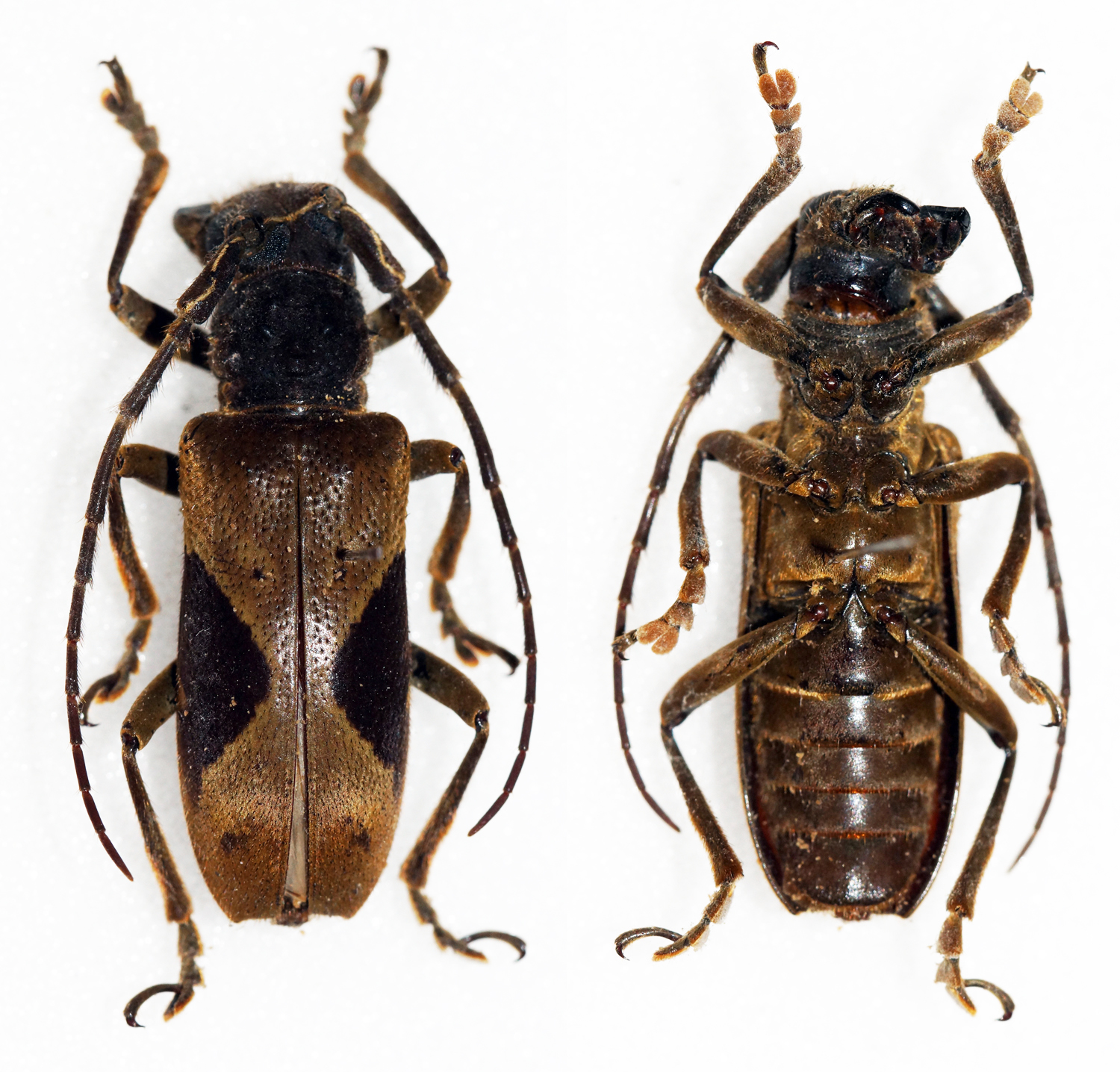

Scientific classification
- Domain: Eukaryota
- Kingdom: Animalia
- Phylum: Arthropoda
- Class: Insecta
- Order: Coleoptera
- Suborder: Polyphaga
- Infraorder: Cucujiformia
- Family: Cerambycidae
- Tribe: Lamiini
- Genus: Monochamus
- Species: M. pictor

Binomial name
- Monochamus pictor (Bates, 1884)

Synonyms
- Laertochamus pictor (Bates, 1884); Monochamus lateriplagiatus Breuning, 1942; Monohammus pictor Bates, 1884

= Monochamus pictor =

Species of beetle

Monochamus pictor is a species of beetle in the family Cerambycidae. It was described by Henry Walter Bates in 1884, originally under the genus Monohammus. It is known from the Democratic Republic of the Congo, Uganda, and Cameroon.
