= Monochamus mexicanus =

Scientific classification
- Kingdom: Animalia
- Phylum: Arthropoda
- Class: Insecta
- Order: Coleoptera
- Suborder: Polyphaga
- Infraorder: Cucujiformia
- Family: Cerambycidae
- Genus: Monochamus
- Species: M. mexicanus

Binomial name
- Monochamus mexicanus (Breuning, 1950)

Synonyms
- Plagiohammus mexicanus Breuning, 1950

Species of beetle

Monochamus mexicanus is a species of beetle in the family Cerambycidae. It was described by Stephan von Breuning in 1950. It is known from Mexico.
