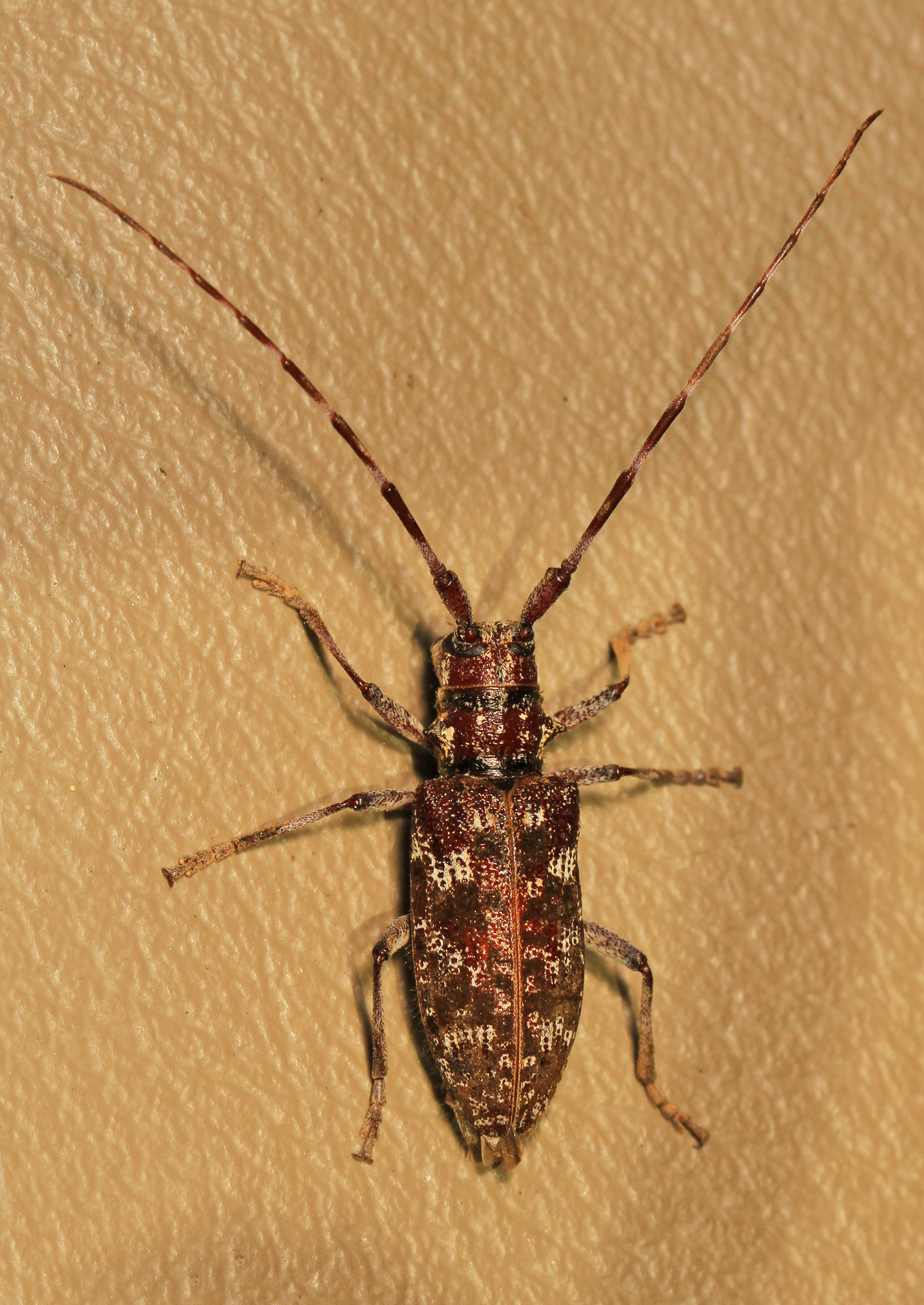

Scientific classification
- Kingdom: Animalia
- Phylum: Arthropoda
- Class: Insecta
- Order: Coleoptera
- Suborder: Polyphaga
- Infraorder: Cucujiformia
- Family: Cerambycidae
- Genus: Monochamus
- Species: M. obtusus

Binomial name
- Monochamus obtusus Casey, 1891

= Monochamus obtusus =

Species of beetle

Monochamus obtusus is a species of beetle in the family Cerambycidae. It was described by Thomas Lincoln Casey Jr. in 1891.

== Subspecies ==
- Monochamus obtusus fulvomaculatus Linsley & Chemsak, 1983
- Monochamus obtusus obtusus Casey, 1891
