= Monochamus vagus =

Scientific classification
- Kingdom: Animalia
- Phylum: Arthropoda
- Class: Insecta
- Order: Coleoptera
- Suborder: Polyphaga
- Infraorder: Cucujiformia
- Family: Cerambycidae
- Genus: Monochamus
- Species: M. vagus

Binomial name
- Monochamus vagus (Gahan, 1888)

Synonyms
- Monohammus vagus Gahan, 1888

Species of beetle

Monochamus vagus is a species of beetle in the family Cerambycidae. It was described by Charles Joseph Gahan in 1888, originally under the genus Monohammus. It is known from the Democratic Republic of the Congo. It contains the varietas Monochamus vagus var. bomasi.
