= Monochamus ochreosticticus =

Scientific classification
- Kingdom: Animalia
- Phylum: Arthropoda
- Class: Insecta
- Order: Coleoptera
- Suborder: Polyphaga
- Infraorder: Cucujiformia
- Family: Cerambycidae
- Genus: Monochamus
- Species: M. ochreosticticus

Binomial name
- Monochamus ochreosticticus Breuning, 1938

Synonyms
- Monochamus flavoguttatus Breuning, 1956

Species of beetle

Monochamus ochreosticticus is a species of beetle in the family Cerambycidae. It was described by Stephan von Breuning in 1938.
