= Monochamus flavosignatus =

Scientific classification
- Kingdom: Animalia
- Phylum: Arthropoda
- Class: Insecta
- Order: Coleoptera
- Suborder: Polyphaga
- Infraorder: Cucujiformia
- Family: Cerambycidae
- Genus: Monochamus
- Species: M. flavosignatus

Binomial name
- Monochamus flavosignatus Breuning, 1947

Species of beetle

Monochamus flavosignatus is a species of beetle in the family Cerambycidae. It was described by Stephan von Breuning in 1947.
