= Monochamus dayremi =

Scientific classification
- Kingdom: Animalia
- Phylum: Arthropoda
- Class: Insecta
- Order: Coleoptera
- Suborder: Polyphaga
- Infraorder: Cucujiformia
- Family: Cerambycidae
- Genus: Monochamus
- Species: M. dayremi

Binomial name
- Monochamus dayremi Breuning, 1935

Species of beetle

Monochamus dayremi is a species of beetle in the family Cerambycidae. It was described by Stephan von Breuning in 1935.
