= Monochamus pseudotuberosus =

Scientific classification
- Kingdom: Animalia
- Phylum: Arthropoda
- Class: Insecta
- Order: Coleoptera
- Suborder: Polyphaga
- Infraorder: Cucujiformia
- Family: Cerambycidae
- Genus: Monochamus
- Species: M. pseudotuberosus

Binomial name
- Monochamus pseudotuberosus Breuning, 1936

Species of beetle

Monochamus pseudotuberosus is a species of beetle in the family Cerambycidae. It was described by Stephan von Breuning in 1936.
