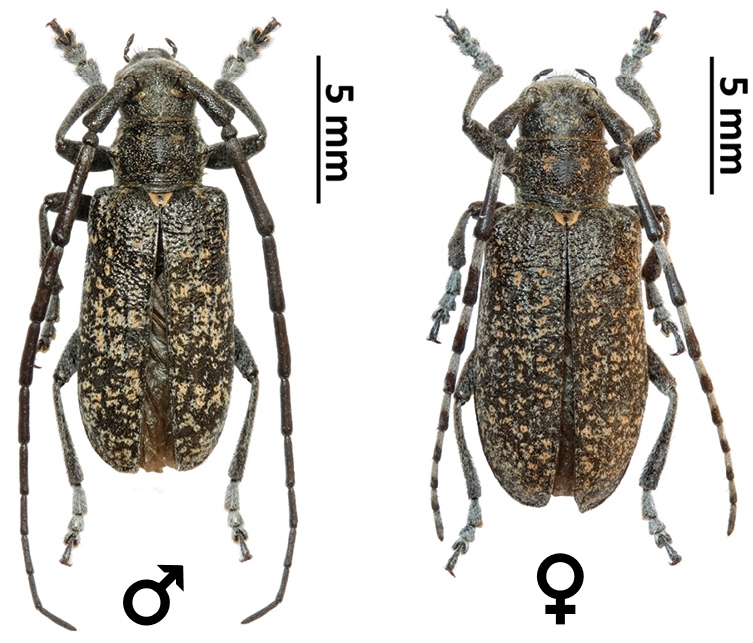

Scientific classification
- Domain: Eukaryota
- Kingdom: Animalia
- Phylum: Arthropoda
- Class: Insecta
- Order: Coleoptera
- Suborder: Polyphaga
- Infraorder: Cucujiformia
- Family: Cerambycidae
- Tribe: Lamiini
- Genus: Monochamus
- Species: M. impluviatus

Binomial name
- Monochamus impluviatus Motschulsky, 1859

= Monochamus impluviatus =

Species of beetle

Monochamus impluviatus, the Siberian speckled sawyer, is a species of beetle in the family Cerambycidae. It was described by Victor Motschulsky in 1859. It is recorded from east of the Ural Mountains in Russia through to the Russian Far East, as well as Mongolia, Northeast China and North Korea.
