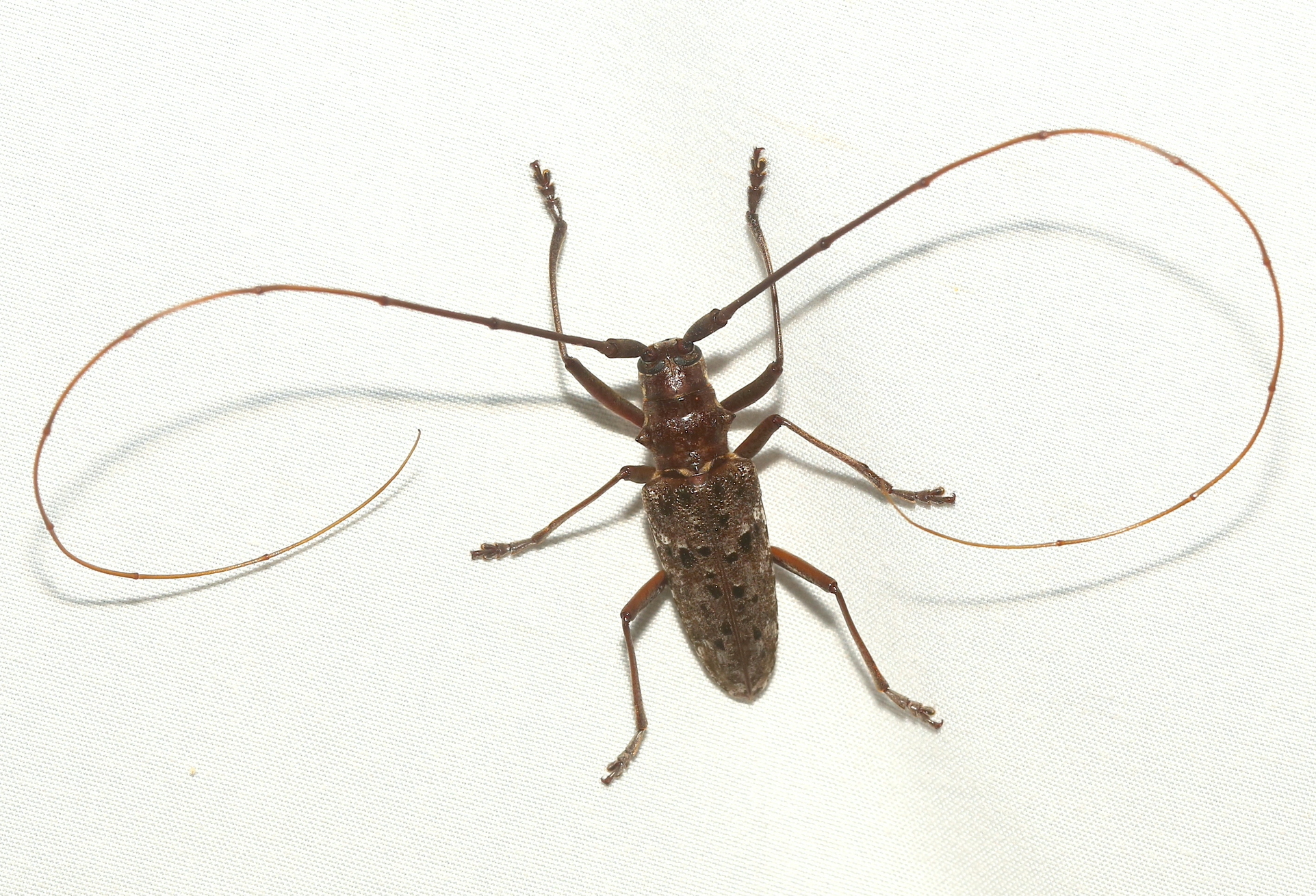

Scientific classification
- Kingdom: Animalia
- Phylum: Arthropoda
- Class: Insecta
- Order: Coleoptera
- Suborder: Polyphaga
- Infraorder: Cucujiformia
- Family: Cerambycidae
- Genus: Monochamus
- Species: M. titillator

Binomial name
- Monochamus titillator (Fabricius, 1775)

= Monochamus titillator =

Species of beetle

Monochamus titillator (southern pine sawyer) is a species of beetle in the family Cerambycidae. It was described by Johan Christian Fabricius in 1775. It is known from the United States.
