= Monochamus nigrovittatus =

Scientific classification
- Kingdom: Animalia
- Phylum: Arthropoda
- Class: Insecta
- Order: Coleoptera
- Suborder: Polyphaga
- Infraorder: Cucujiformia
- Family: Cerambycidae
- Genus: Monochamus
- Species: M. nigrovittatus

Binomial name
- Monochamus nigrovittatus Breuning, 1938

Synonyms
- Oxylamia leonensis Breuning, 1956

Species of beetle

Monochamus nigrovittatus is a species of beetle in the family Cerambycidae. It was described by Stephan von Breuning in 1938. It is known from Sierra Leone and the Ivory Coast.
