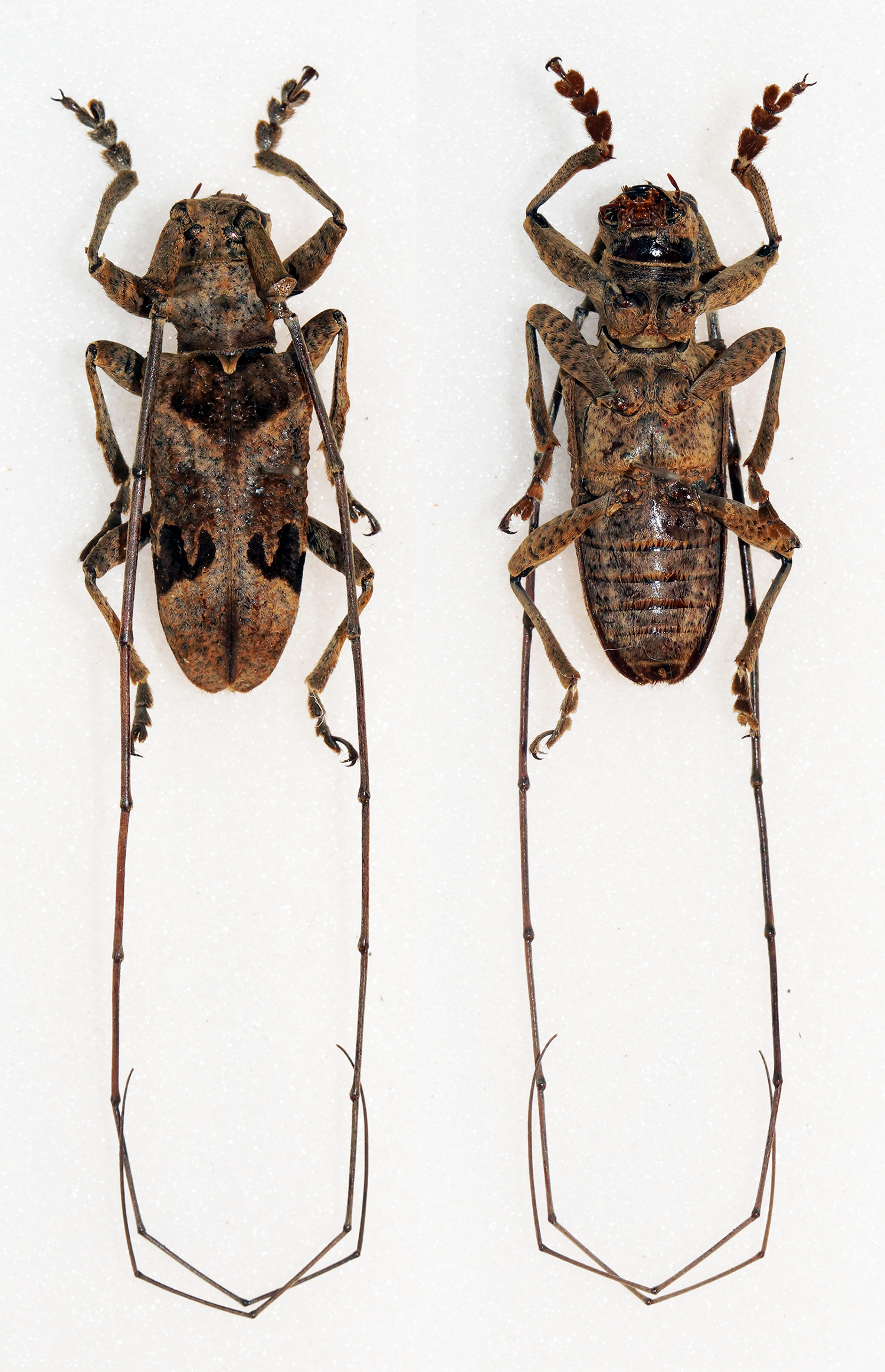

Scientific classification
- Domain: Eukaryota
- Kingdom: Animalia
- Phylum: Arthropoda
- Class: Insecta
- Order: Coleoptera
- Suborder: Polyphaga
- Infraorder: Cucujiformia
- Family: Cerambycidae
- Tribe: Lamiini
- Genus: Monochamus
- Species: M. spectabilis

Binomial name
- Monochamus spectabilis (Perroud, 1855)

Synonyms
- Lophoptera fischeri Kolbe, 1897; Lophoptera minor Kolbe, 1897; Lophoptera spectabilis Perroud, 1855; Monochamus asperulus White, 1858

= Monochamus spectabilis =

Species of beetle

Monochamus spectabilis is a species of beetle in the family Cerambycidae. It was described by Perroud in 1855, originally under the genus Lophoptera. It has a wide distribution throughout Africa. It contains the varietas Monochamus spectabilis var. immaculipennis.
