= Monochamus benito =

Scientific classification
- Domain: Eukaryota
- Kingdom: Animalia
- Phylum: Arthropoda
- Class: Insecta
- Order: Coleoptera
- Suborder: Polyphaga
- Infraorder: Cucujiformia
- Family: Cerambycidae
- Tribe: Lamiini
- Genus: Monochamus
- Species: M. benito

Binomial name
- Monochamus benito (Dillon & Dillon, 1959)

Synonyms
- Noserocera benito Dillon & Dillon, 1959

Species of beetle

Monochamus benito is a species of beetle in the family Cerambycidae. It was described by Dillon and Dillon in 1959.
