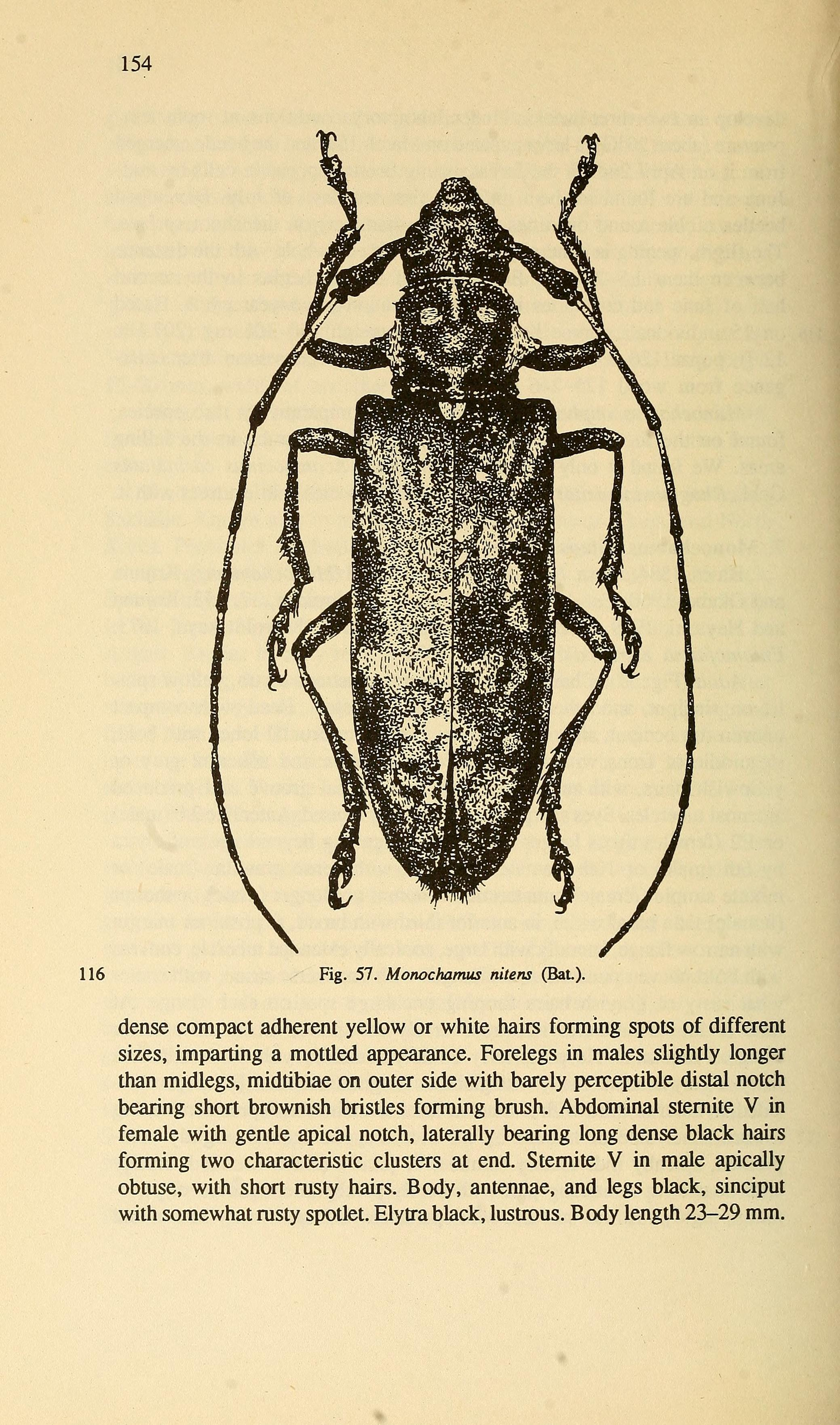
- Monochamus nitens

Scientific classification
- Domain: Eukaryota
- Kingdom: Animalia
- Phylum: Arthropoda
- Class: Insecta
- Order: Coleoptera
- Suborder: Polyphaga
- Infraorder: Cucujiformia
- Family: Cerambycidae
- Tribe: Lamiini
- Genus: Monochamus
- Species: M. nitens

Binomial name
- Monochamus nitens Bates, 1884

Synonyms
- Monohammus griseonotatus Pic, 1921; Monohammus nitens Bates, 1884

= Monochamus nitens =

Species of beetle

Monochamus nitens is a species of beetle in the family Cerambycidae. It was described by Henry Walter Bates in 1884.
