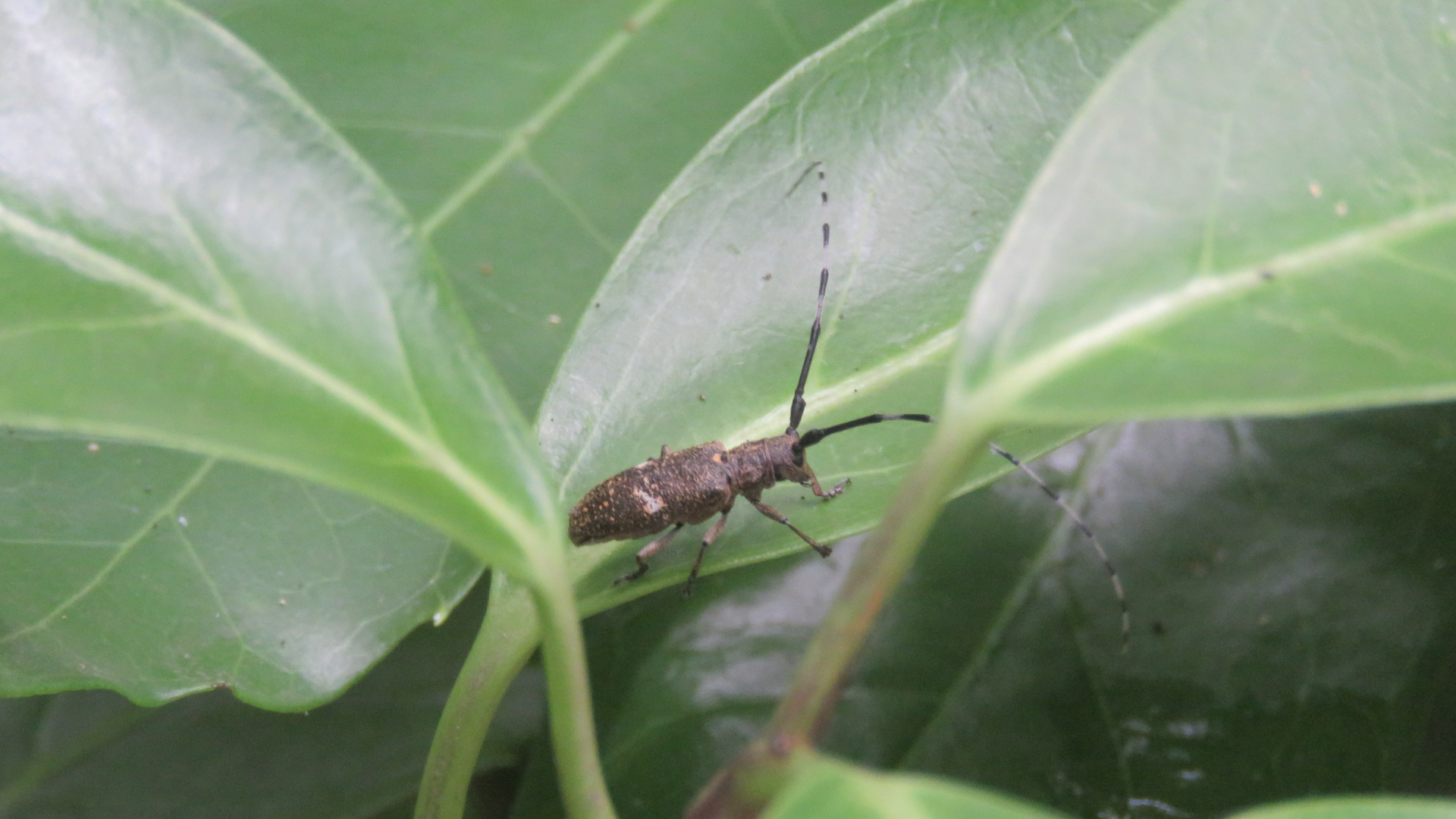

Scientific classification
- Domain: Eukaryota
- Kingdom: Animalia
- Phylum: Arthropoda
- Class: Insecta
- Order: Coleoptera
- Suborder: Polyphaga
- Infraorder: Cucujiformia
- Family: Cerambycidae
- Tribe: Lamiini
- Genus: Monochamus
- Species: M. subfasciatus

Binomial name
- Monochamus subfasciatus (Bates, 1873)

Synonyms
- Monohammus subfasciatus Bates, 1873; Monohammus Beloni Pic, 1902; Monochamus fascioguttatus Gressitt, 1938; Monochamus subfasciatus ab. infasciatus Fujimura, 1956 (Unav.)

= Monochamus subfasciatus =

Species of beetle

Monochamus subfasciatus is a species of beetle in the family Cerambycidae. It was described by Henry Walter Bates in 1873. It is recorded from Japan where it infests Japanese red pine and is a vector of the nematode Bursaphelenchus doui.

== Subspecies ==
- Monochamus subfasciatus kumageinsularis Hayashi, 1962
- Monochamus subfasciatus meridianus Hayashi, 1955
- Monochamus subfasciatus shikokuensis Breuning, 1956
- Monochamus subfasciatus subfasciatus (Bates, 1873)
