= Monochamus foveolatus =

Scientific classification
- Kingdom: Animalia
- Phylum: Arthropoda
- Class: Insecta
- Order: Coleoptera
- Suborder: Polyphaga
- Infraorder: Cucujiformia
- Family: Cerambycidae
- Genus: Monochamus
- Species: M. foveolatus

Binomial name
- Monochamus foveolatus Hintz, 1911

Synonyms
- Monochamus unicolor Breuning, 1939

Species of beetle

Monochamus foveolatus is a species of beetle in the family Cerambycidae. It was described by Hintz, in 1911.
