= Monochamus luteodispersus =

Scientific classification
- Kingdom: Animalia
- Phylum: Arthropoda
- Class: Insecta
- Order: Coleoptera
- Suborder: Polyphaga
- Infraorder: Cucujiformia
- Family: Cerambycidae
- Genus: Monochamus
- Species: M. luteodispersus

Binomial name
- Monochamus luteodispersus Pic, 1927

Species of beetle

Monochamus luteodispersus is a species of beetle in the family Cerambycidae. It was described by Maurice Pic in 1927.
