= Monochamus serratus =

Scientific classification
- Domain: Eukaryota
- Kingdom: Animalia
- Phylum: Arthropoda
- Class: Insecta
- Order: Coleoptera
- Suborder: Polyphaga
- Infraorder: Cucujiformia
- Family: Cerambycidae
- Tribe: Lamiini
- Genus: Monochamus
- Species: M. serratus

Binomial name
- Monochamus serratus (Gahan, 1906)

Synonyms
- Monohammus serratus Gahan, 1906

Species of beetle

Monochamus serratus is a species of beetle in the family Cerambycidae. It was described by Charles Joseph Gahan in 1906. It is known from Malaysia.
