= Monochamus alboapicalis =

Scientific classification
- Kingdom: Animalia
- Phylum: Arthropoda
- Class: Insecta
- Order: Coleoptera
- Suborder: Polyphaga
- Infraorder: Cucujiformia
- Family: Cerambycidae
- Genus: Monochamus
- Species: M. alboapicalis

Binomial name
- Monochamus alboapicalis (Pic, 1934)

Synonyms
- Trysimia alboapicalis Pic, 1934

Species of beetle

Monochamus alboapicalis is a species of beetle in the family Cerambycidae. It was described by Maurice Pic in 1934.
