= Monochamus regularis =

Scientific classification
- Kingdom: Animalia
- Phylum: Arthropoda
- Clade: Pancrustacea
- Class: Insecta
- Order: Coleoptera
- Suborder: Polyphaga
- Infraorder: Cucujiformia
- Family: Cerambycidae
- Genus: Monochamus
- Species: M. regularis

Binomial name
- Monochamus regularis (Aurivillius, 1924)

Synonyms
- Monochamus granulosus Breuning & De Jong, 1941; Anhammus regularis Aurivillius, 1924

Species of beetle

Monochamus regularis is a species of beetle in the family Cerambycidae. It was described by Per Olof Christopher Aurivillius in 1924. It is known from Malaysia, Borneo and Sumatra.
