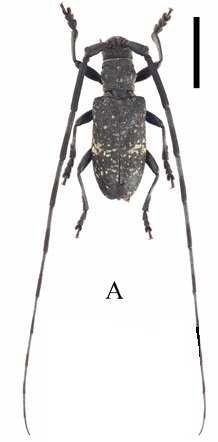

Scientific classification
- Kingdom: Animalia
- Phylum: Arthropoda
- Class: Insecta
- Order: Coleoptera
- Suborder: Polyphaga
- Infraorder: Cucujiformia
- Family: Cerambycidae
- Genus: Monochamus
- Species: M. sparsutus

Binomial name
- Monochamus sparsutus Fairmaire, 1889

= Monochamus sparsutus =

Species of beetle

Monochamus sparsutus is a species of beetle in the family Cerambycidae. It was described by Léon Fairmaire in 1889. This species is found in China (Sichuan, Anhui, Fujian, Henan, Hubei, Hunan, Jiangxi, Shaanxi, Yunnan, Zhejiang) and Taiwan.
