= Monochamus talianus =

Scientific classification
- Kingdom: Animalia
- Phylum: Arthropoda
- Class: Insecta
- Order: Coleoptera
- Suborder: Polyphaga
- Infraorder: Cucujiformia
- Family: Cerambycidae
- Genus: Monochamus
- Species: M. talianus

Binomial name
- Monochamus talianus Pic, 1912

Species of beetle

Monochamus talianus is a species of beetle in the family Cerambycidae. It was described by Maurice Pic in 1912.
