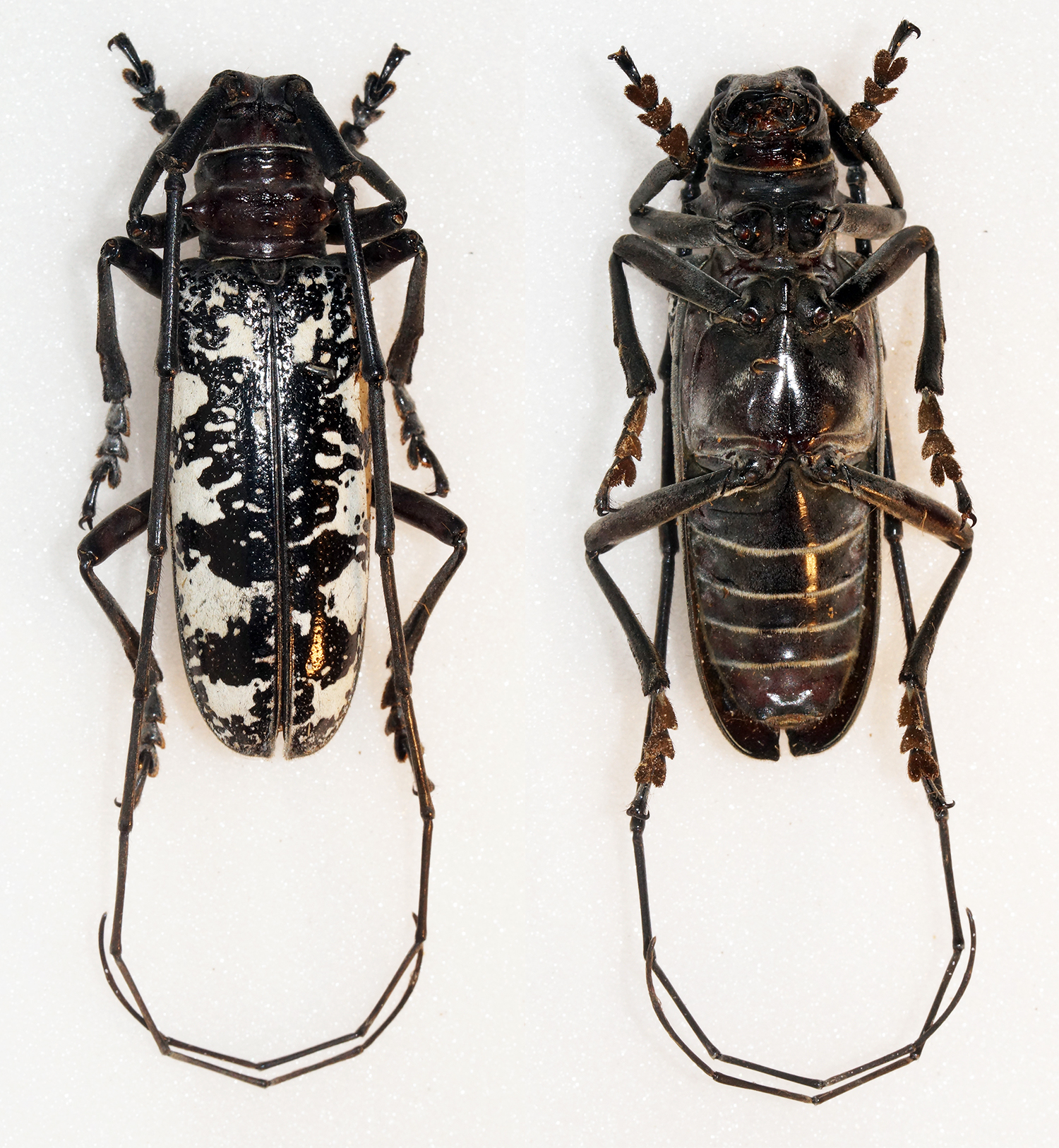

Scientific classification
- Domain: Eukaryota
- Kingdom: Animalia
- Phylum: Arthropoda
- Class: Insecta
- Order: Coleoptera
- Suborder: Polyphaga
- Infraorder: Cucujiformia
- Family: Cerambycidae
- Tribe: Lamiini
- Genus: Monochamus
- Species: M. sargi

Binomial name
- Monochamus sargi (Bates, 1885)

Synonyms
- Hammoderus sargi Bates, 1885; Plagiohammus sargi (Bates, 1885)

= Monochamus sargi =

Species of beetle

Monochamus sargi is a species of beetle in the family Cerambycidae. It was described by Henry Walter Bates in 1885. It is known from Mexico and Guatemala.
