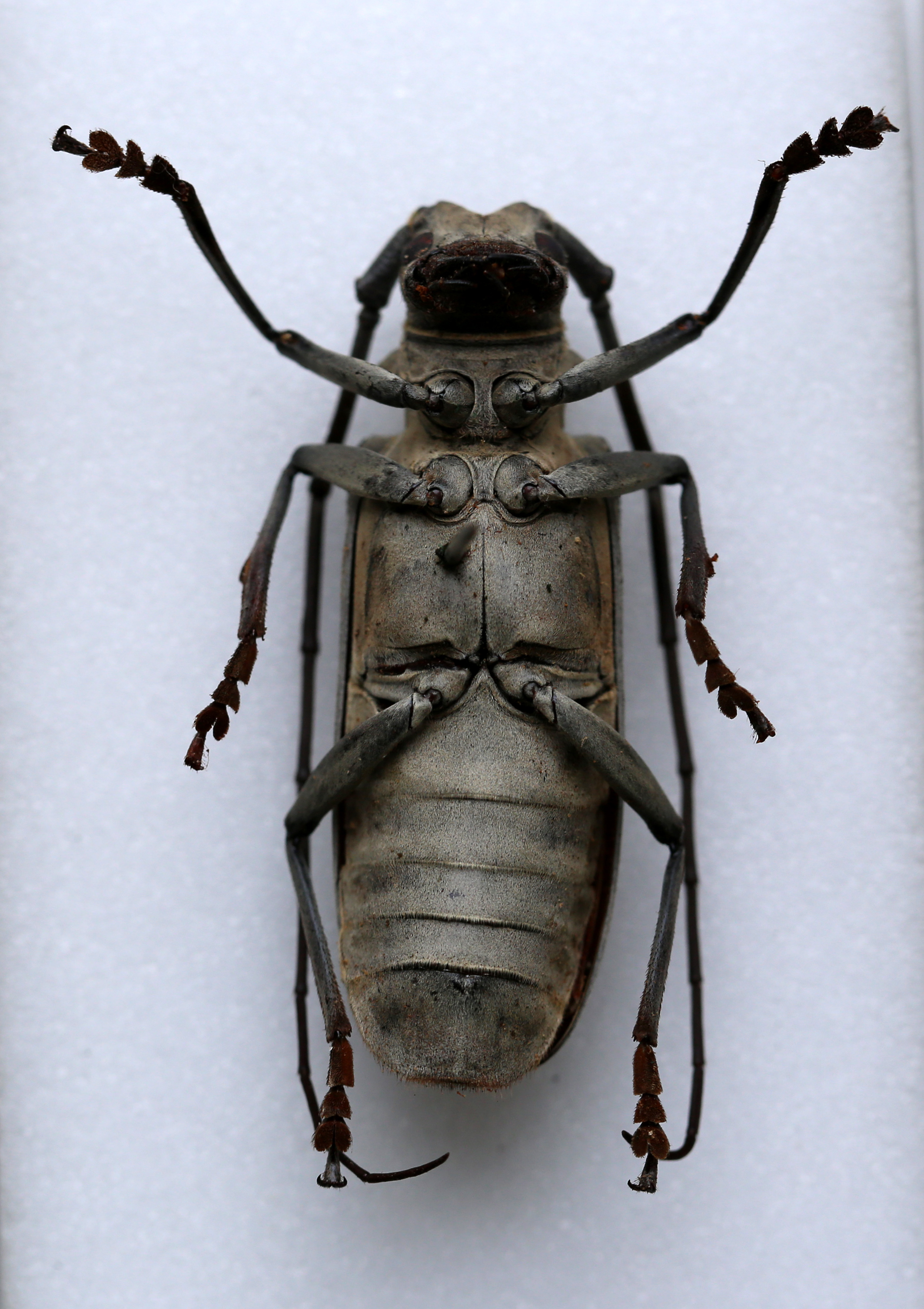

Scientific classification
- Domain: Eukaryota
- Kingdom: Animalia
- Phylum: Arthropoda
- Class: Insecta
- Order: Coleoptera
- Suborder: Polyphaga
- Infraorder: Cucujiformia
- Family: Cerambycidae
- Tribe: Lamiini
- Genus: Monochamus
- Species: M. gravidus

Binomial name
- Monochamus gravidus (Pascoe, 1858)

Synonyms
- Apriona multimaculata Pic, 1933; Monohammus gravidus Pascoe, 1858

= Monochamus gravidus =

Species of beetle

Monochamus gravidus is a species of beetle in the family Cerambycidae. It was described by Francis Polkinghorne Pascoe in 1858. It is known from Malaysia and China.
