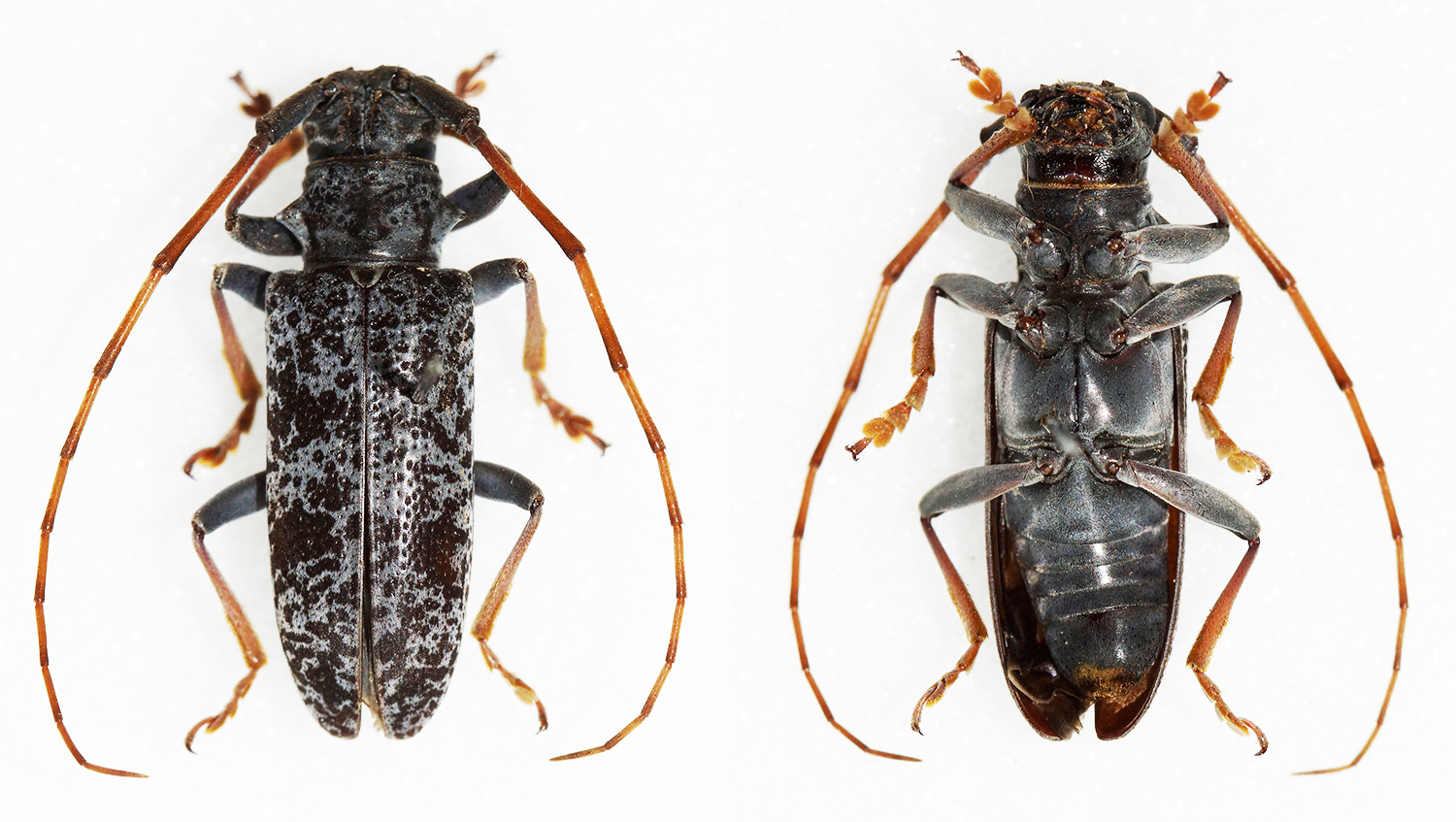

Scientific classification
- Domain: Eukaryota
- Kingdom: Animalia
- Phylum: Arthropoda
- Class: Insecta
- Order: Coleoptera
- Suborder: Polyphaga
- Infraorder: Cucujiformia
- Family: Cerambycidae
- Tribe: Lamiini
- Genus: Monochamus
- Species: M. irrorator

Binomial name
- Monochamus irrorator (Chevrolat, 1855)

Synonyms
- Ethiopiochamus irrorator (Chevrolat, 1855); Monohammus irrorator Chevrolat, 1855; ?Monohammus sparsutor Chevrolat, 1855

= Monochamus irrorator =

Species of beetle

Monochamus irrorator is a species of beetle in the family Cerambycidae. It was described by Louis Alexandre Auguste Chevrolat in 1855, originally spelled as "Monohammus" irrorator. It is known from the Republic of the Congo and Nigeria.

== Subspecies ==
- Monochamus irrorator cineraceus (Jordan, 1894)
- Monochamus irrorator irrorator (Chevrolat, 1855)
