= Monochamus thomsoni =

Scientific classification
- Domain: Eukaryota
- Kingdom: Animalia
- Phylum: Arthropoda
- Class: Insecta
- Order: Coleoptera
- Suborder: Polyphaga
- Infraorder: Cucujiformia
- Family: Cerambycidae
- Tribe: Lamiini
- Genus: Monochamus
- Species: M. thomsoni

Binomial name
- Monochamus thomsoni (Chevrolat, 1855)

Synonyms
- Monohammus Thomsoni Chevrolat, 1855; Parochamus thomsoni buea Dillon & Dillon, 1961; Monochamus thomsoni m. fuscoreducta Teocchi, 1991 (Unav.)

Species of beetle

Monochamus thomsoni is a species of beetle in the family Cerambycidae. It was described by Louis Alexandre Auguste Chevrolat in 1855, originally under the genus Monohammus. It has a wide distribution throughout Africa. It contains the subspecies Monochamus thomsoni marshalli.
