= Monochamus griseoplagiatus =

Scientific classification
- Domain: Eukaryota
- Kingdom: Animalia
- Phylum: Arthropoda
- Class: Insecta
- Order: Coleoptera
- Suborder: Polyphaga
- Infraorder: Cucujiformia
- Family: Cerambycidae
- Tribe: Lamiini
- Genus: Monochamus
- Species: M. griseoplagiatus

Binomial name
- Monochamus griseoplagiatus Thomson, 1858

Synonyms
- Ethiopiochamus griseoplagiatus (Thomson) Dillon & Dillon, 1961

Species of beetle

Monochamus griseoplagiatus is a species of beetle in the family Cerambycidae. It was described by James Thomson in 1858. This species is known from Sierra Leone and Gabon.

== Subspecies ==
- Monochamus griseoplagiatus griseoplagiatus Thomson, 1858
- Monochamus griseoplagiatus leonensis (Dillon & Dillon, 1961)
