= Monochamus accri =

Scientific classification
- Domain: Eukaryota
- Kingdom: Animalia
- Phylum: Arthropoda
- Class: Insecta
- Order: Coleoptera
- Suborder: Polyphaga
- Infraorder: Cucujiformia
- Family: Cerambycidae
- Tribe: Lamiini
- Genus: Monochamus
- Species: M. accri

Binomial name
- Monochamus accri (Dillon & Dillon, 1959)

Synonyms
- Laertochamus accri Dillon & Dillon, 1959

Species of beetle

Monochamus accri is a species of beetle in the family Cerambycidae. It was described by Dillon and Dillon in 1959, originally under the genus Laertochamus.
