= Monochamus scabiosus =

Scientific classification
- Domain: Eukaryota
- Kingdom: Animalia
- Phylum: Arthropoda
- Class: Insecta
- Order: Coleoptera
- Suborder: Polyphaga
- Infraorder: Cucujiformia
- Family: Cerambycidae
- Tribe: Lamiini
- Genus: Monochamus
- Species: M. scabiosus

Binomial name
- Monochamus scabiosus (Quedenfeldt, 1882)

Synonyms
- Ethiopiochamus scabiosus (Quedenfeldt) Dillon & Dillon, 1961; Monohammus scabiosus Quedenfeldt, 1882

Species of beetle

Monochamus scabiosus is a species of beetle in the family Cerambycidae. It was described by Quedenfeldt in 1882, originally under the genus Monohammus.
