= Monochamus marmorator =

Scientific classification
- Domain: Eukaryota
- Kingdom: Animalia
- Phylum: Arthropoda
- Class: Insecta
- Order: Coleoptera
- Suborder: Polyphaga
- Infraorder: Cucujiformia
- Family: Cerambycidae
- Tribe: Lamiini
- Genus: Monochamus
- Species: M. marmorator

Binomial name
- Monochamus marmorator Kirby in Richardson, 1837

Species of beetle

Monochamus marmorator is a species of beetle in the family Cerambycidae. It was described by William Kirby in 1837. It is known from Canada.
