= Monochamus adamitus =

Scientific classification
- Domain: Eukaryota
- Kingdom: Animalia
- Phylum: Arthropoda
- Class: Insecta
- Order: Coleoptera
- Suborder: Polyphaga
- Infraorder: Cucujiformia
- Family: Cerambycidae
- Tribe: Lamiini
- Genus: Monochamus
- Species: M. adamitus

Binomial name
- Monochamus adamitus Thomson, 1857

Synonyms
- Quasiochamus adamitus (Thomson) Dillon & Dillon, 1961

Species of beetle

Monochamus adamitus is a species of beetle in the family Cerambycidae. It was described by James Thomson in 1857. It is known from Tanzania, Sierra Leone, Angola, Ghana, Mozambique, the Ivory Coast, Senegal, the Democratic Republic of the Congo, Malawi, and Zimbabwe.

== Subspecies ==
- Monochamus adamitus adamitus Thomson, 1857
- Monochamus adamitus gazensis (Dillon & Dillon, 1961)
- Monochamus adamitus nyassensis Gahan, 1888
- Monochamus adamitus pannulatus (Quedenfeldt, 1882)
- Monochamus adamitus proximus Breuning, 1935
- Monochamus adamitus schoutedeni Breuning, 1935
