= Monochamus aparus =

Scientific classification
- Domain: Eukaryota
- Kingdom: Animalia
- Phylum: Arthropoda
- Class: Insecta
- Order: Coleoptera
- Suborder: Polyphaga
- Infraorder: Cucujiformia
- Family: Cerambycidae
- Tribe: Lamiini
- Genus: Monochamus
- Species: M. aparus

Binomial name
- Monochamus aparus (Jordan, 1903)

Synonyms
- Bixadus aparus Jordan, 1903; Marginobixadus aparus (Jordan) Dillon & Dillon, 1959

Species of beetle

Monochamus aparus is a species of beetle in the family Cerambycidae. It was described by Karl Jordan in 1903, originally under the genus Bixadus. It is known from the Democratic Republic of the Congo, Cameroon, and Gabon.
