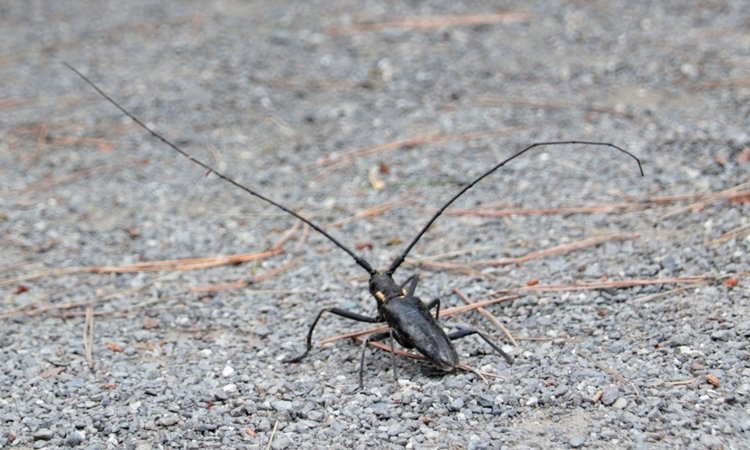
- Monochamus grandis

Scientific classification
- Domain: Eukaryota
- Kingdom: Animalia
- Phylum: Arthropoda
- Class: Insecta
- Order: Coleoptera
- Suborder: Polyphaga
- Infraorder: Cucujiformia
- Family: Cerambycidae
- Tribe: Lamiini
- Genus: Monochamus
- Species: M. grandis

Binomial name
- Monochamus grandis Waterhouse, 1881

= Monochamus grandis =

Species of beetle

Monochamus grandis is a species of beetle in the family Cerambycidae. It was described by Waterhouse in 1881. It is known from Japan.
