= Monochamus lunifer =

Scientific classification
- Domain: Eukaryota
- Kingdom: Animalia
- Phylum: Arthropoda
- Class: Insecta
- Order: Coleoptera
- Suborder: Polyphaga
- Infraorder: Cucujiformia
- Family: Cerambycidae
- Tribe: Lamiini
- Genus: Monochamus
- Species: M. lunifer

Binomial name
- Monochamus lunifer (Aurivillius, 1891)

Synonyms
- Mendinus lunifer (Aurivillius) Dillon & Dillon, 1959; Monohammus lunifer Aurivillius, 1891

Species of beetle

Monochamus lunifer is a species of beetle in the family Cerambycidae. It was described by Per Olof Christopher Aurivillius in 1891, originally under the genus Monohammus. It is known from Ghana.
