= Monochamus balteatus =

Scientific classification
- Domain: Eukaryota
- Kingdom: Animalia
- Phylum: Arthropoda
- Class: Insecta
- Order: Coleoptera
- Suborder: Polyphaga
- Infraorder: Cucujiformia
- Family: Cerambycidae
- Tribe: Lamiini
- Genus: Monochamus
- Species: M. balteatus

Binomial name
- Monochamus balteatus Aurivillius, 1903

Species of beetle

Monochamus balteatus is a species of beetle in the family Cerambycidae. It was described by Per Olof Christopher Aurivillius in 1903.
