= Monochamus kinabaluensis =

Scientific classification
- Kingdom: Animalia
- Phylum: Arthropoda
- Class: Insecta
- Order: Coleoptera
- Suborder: Polyphaga
- Infraorder: Cucujiformia
- Family: Cerambycidae
- Genus: Monochamus
- Species: M. kinabaluensis

Binomial name
- Monochamus kinabaluensis Hüdepohl, 1996

Species of beetle

Monochamus kinabaluensis is a species of beetle in the family Cerambycidae. It was described by Karl-Ernst Hüdepohl in 1996. It is known from Borneo.
