= Monochamus strandi =

Scientific classification
- Kingdom: Animalia
- Phylum: Arthropoda
- Class: Insecta
- Order: Coleoptera
- Suborder: Polyphaga
- Infraorder: Cucujiformia
- Family: Cerambycidae
- Genus: Monochamus
- Species: M. strandi

Binomial name
- Monochamus strandi Breuning, 1939

Synonyms
- Mendinus strandi (Breuning) Dillon & Dillon, 1959

Species of beetle

Monochamus strandi is a species of beetle in the family Cerambycidae. It was described by Stephan von Breuning in 1939. It is known from Equatorial Guinea, the Democratic Republic of the Congo, Gabon, Cameroon, and the Ivory Coast.
