= Monochamus nigromaculicollis =

Scientific classification
- Kingdom: Animalia
- Phylum: Arthropoda
- Class: Insecta
- Order: Coleoptera
- Suborder: Polyphaga
- Infraorder: Cucujiformia
- Family: Cerambycidae
- Genus: Monochamus
- Species: M. nigromaculicollis

Binomial name
- Monochamus nigromaculicollis Breuning, 1974

Species of beetle

Monochamus nigromaculicollis is a species of beetle in the family Cerambycidae. It was described by Stephan von Breuning in 1974.
