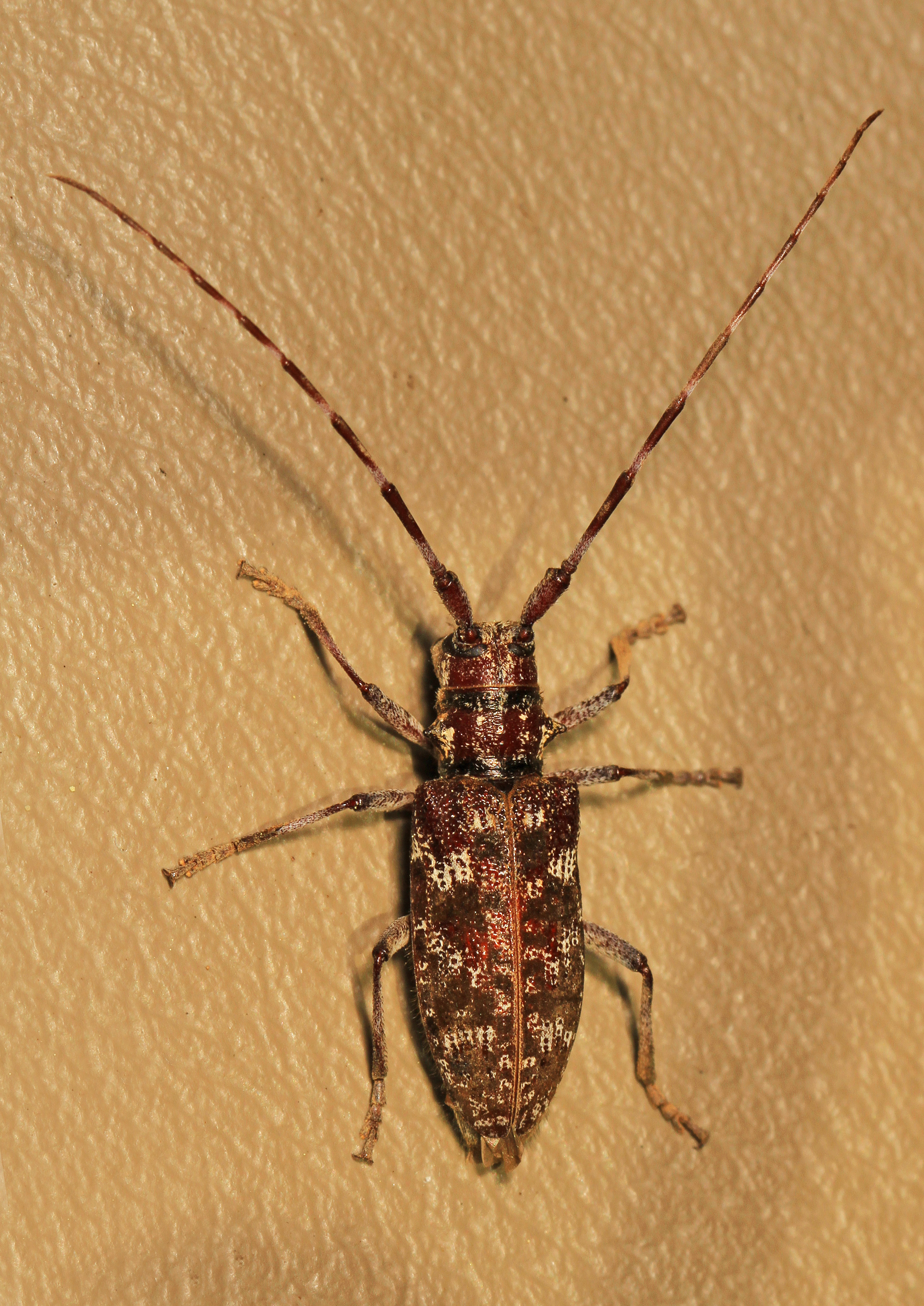
- Spotted pine sawyer - Monochamus clamator, near Bassetts, California

Scientific classification
- Domain: Eukaryota
- Kingdom: Animalia
- Phylum: Arthropoda
- Class: Insecta
- Order: Coleoptera
- Suborder: Polyphaga
- Infraorder: Cucujiformia
- Family: Cerambycidae
- Tribe: Lamiini
- Genus: Monochamus
- Species: M. clamator

Binomial name
- Monochamus clamator (LeConte, 1852)

= Monochamus clamator =

Species of beetle

Monochamus clamator, the spotted pine sawyer, is a species of beetle in the family Cerambycidae. It was described by John Lawrence LeConte in 1852.

== Subspecies ==
- Monochamus clamator clamator (LeConte, 1852)
- Monochamus clamator latus Casey, 1924
- Monochamus clamator linsleyi Dillon & Dillon, 1941
- Monochamus clamator nevadensis Dillon & Dillon, 1941
- Monochamus clamator rubigineus (Bates, 1880)
