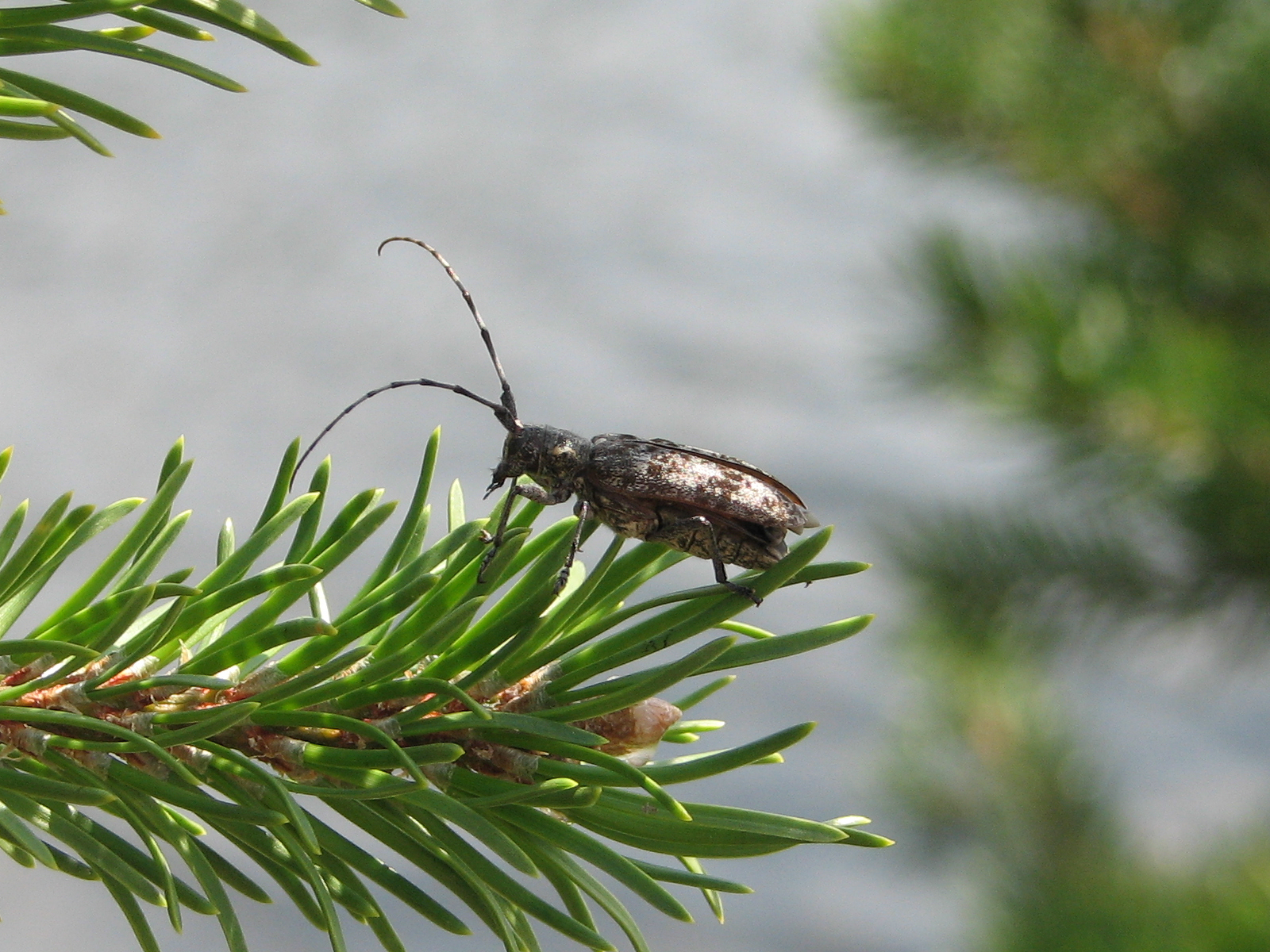

Scientific classification
- Domain: Eukaryota
- Kingdom: Animalia
- Phylum: Arthropoda
- Class: Insecta
- Order: Coleoptera
- Suborder: Polyphaga
- Infraorder: Cucujiformia
- Family: Cerambycidae
- Tribe: Lamiini
- Genus: Monochamus
- Species: M. maculosus

Binomial name
- Monochamus maculosus Haldeman, 1847

Synonyms
- Monochamus mutator LeConte, 1850

= Monochamus maculosus =

Species of beetle

Monochamus maculosus, the spotted pine sawyer, is a species of beetle in the family Cerambycidae. It is known from Canada and the United States, and was formerly known as Monochamus mutator.
