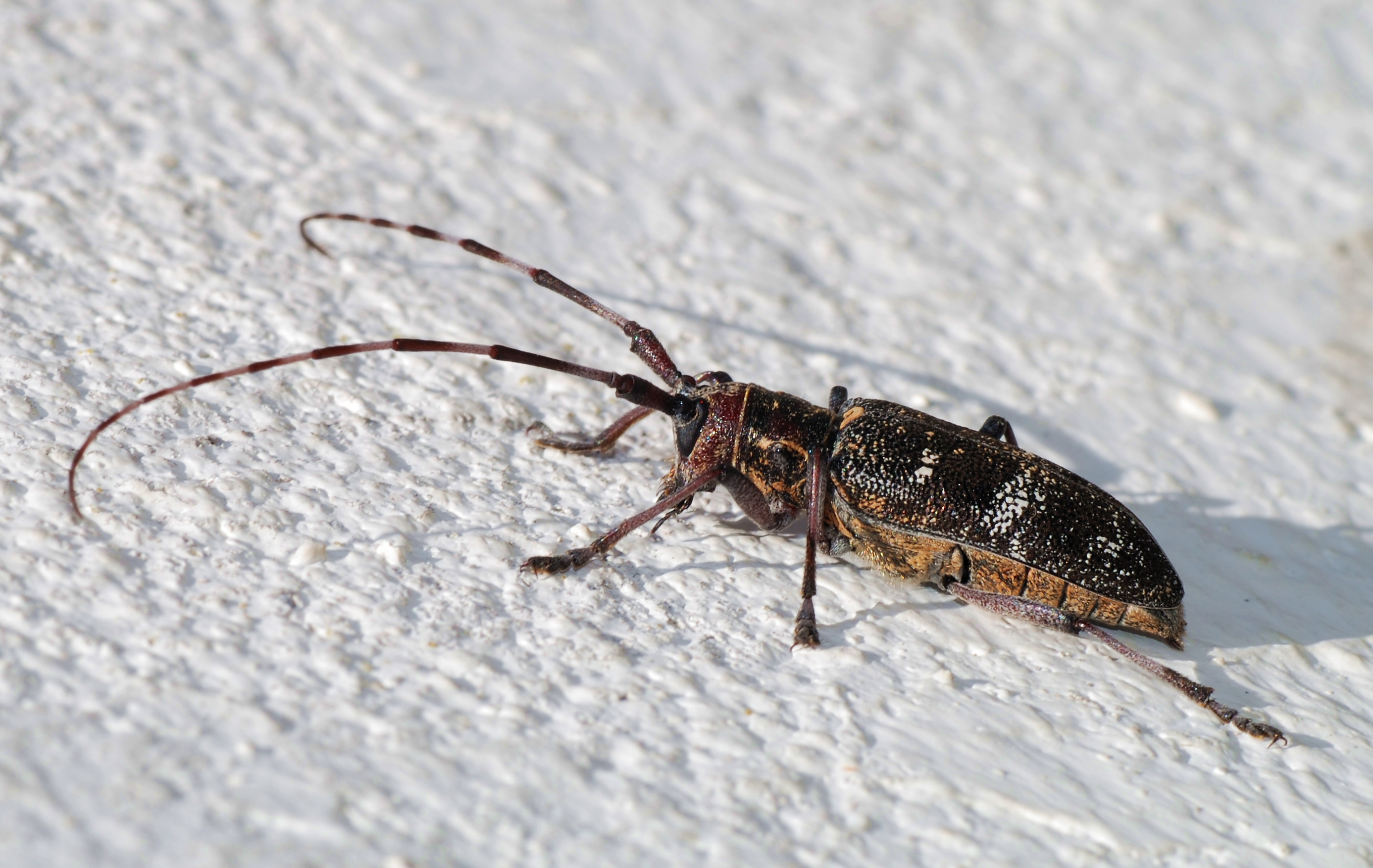
- Monochamus galloprovincialis

Scientific classification
- Kingdom: Animalia
- Phylum: Arthropoda
- Clade: Pancrustacea
- Class: Insecta
- Order: Coleoptera
- Suborder: Polyphaga
- Infraorder: Cucujiformia
- Family: Cerambycidae
- Tribe: Lamiini
- Genus: Monochamus; Dejean, 1821

Synonyms
- Monohammus Dahl, 1823 (Suppr.); Monachammus Gray 1832 (Missp.); Monohammus Dejean 1835 (Emend.); Monohamus Guérin-Méneville 1844 (Missp.); Meges Pascoe 1866

= Monochamus =

Genus of beetles

Monochamus is a genus of longhorn beetles found throughout the world. They are commonly known as sawyer beetles or sawyers, as their larvae bore into dead or dying trees, especially conifers such as pines. They are the type genus of the Monochamini, a tribe in the huge long-horned beetle subfamily Lamiinae, but typically included in the Lamiini today.

If sawyer beetles infest freshly cut pine logs, they can cause a 30–40% loss in value due to the tunnels their larvae bore. It is important to process logs within a few weeks of cutting or store them in water to minimize damage. Some species are known to transport phoretic Bursaphelenchus nematodes, including B. xylophilus which causes pine wilt disease.

== Description ==
Beetles in this genus are black or mottled gray in colour. Like other Lamiinae, the head is oriented vertically with ventral mouthparts. The scape (first antennal segment) has a circatrix, a carinate ring or scar-like area near the tip. Antennae of females are roughly as long as the body, while antennae of males are twice as long. The tarsal claws are divergent.

== Life cycle ==
Adults feed within the crowns of healthy trees. Adult females oviposit (lay eggs) in slits in the bark of dying or dead trees. Larvae hatch from eggs and develop in wood, passing through several instars. Next is a pupal stage. In spring, new adults emerge, starting the life cycle again.

== Association with nematodes ==
The pine wood nematode Bursaphalenchus xylophilous is transmitted by several Monochamus species, and its life cycle is tied with that of its vector.

When nematode-infested adult Monochamus feed on healthy trees, they create wounds that allow nematodes to enter. In a susceptible host tree, nematodes breed in the xylem and eventually kill the tree. In a resistant host, the nematodes die instead.

When nematode-infested adult Monochamus oviposit in dying or dead trees, the slits they make in the bark for their eggs also allow nematodes to enter. Nematodes reproduce and feed on wood cells or fungi. Eventually, new Monochamus adults emerge from pupae, and while these are still callow, nematodes enter them via the thoracic spiracles.

== Associations with other organisms ==
Bark beetles oviposit on trees at around the same time as Monochamus, and they transmit blue stain fungi. Bursaphalenchus nematodes feed on this fungi, and the combination of fungi and nematodes may help in overcoming host tree defences, creating a more suitable habitat for bark beetles and Monochamus. Additionally, Monochamus compete with bark beetles for resources, prey on them (intraguild predation) and use their semiochemicals as kairomones.

Some species of braconid wasps in the genus Atanycolus are parasitoids of Monochamus, along with other wood-boring beetles.

The black-backed woodpecker is a predator on larvae of wood-boring beetles, including Monochamus.

== Taxonomy ==
The genus is very large, and its boundaries have varied considerably over time, with many species placed in this genus that have long since been removed, and species placed in other genera that have been added, and there are at least 20 subgenera presently recognized by most authorities.

=== Species ===
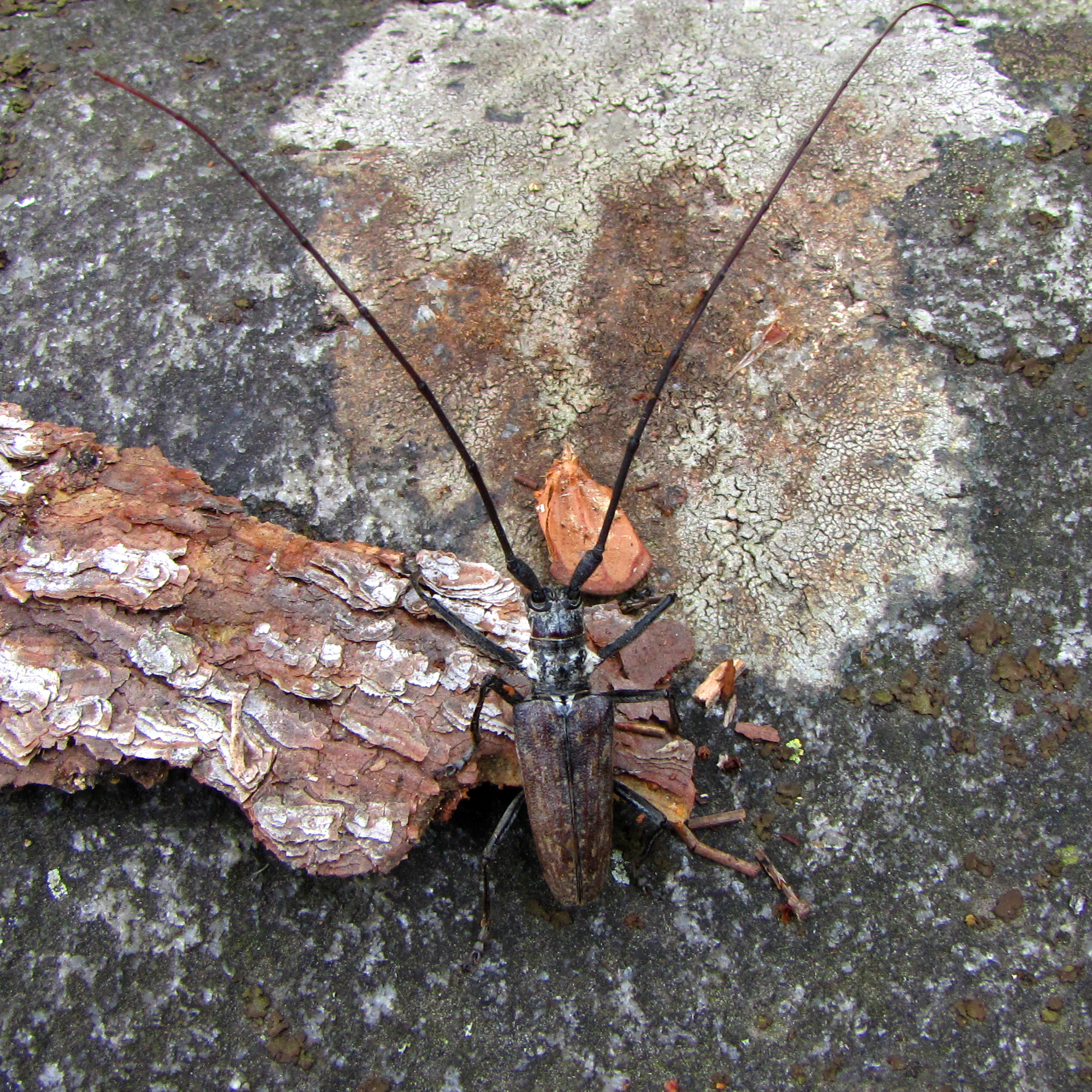
Notable sawyer (M. notatus)

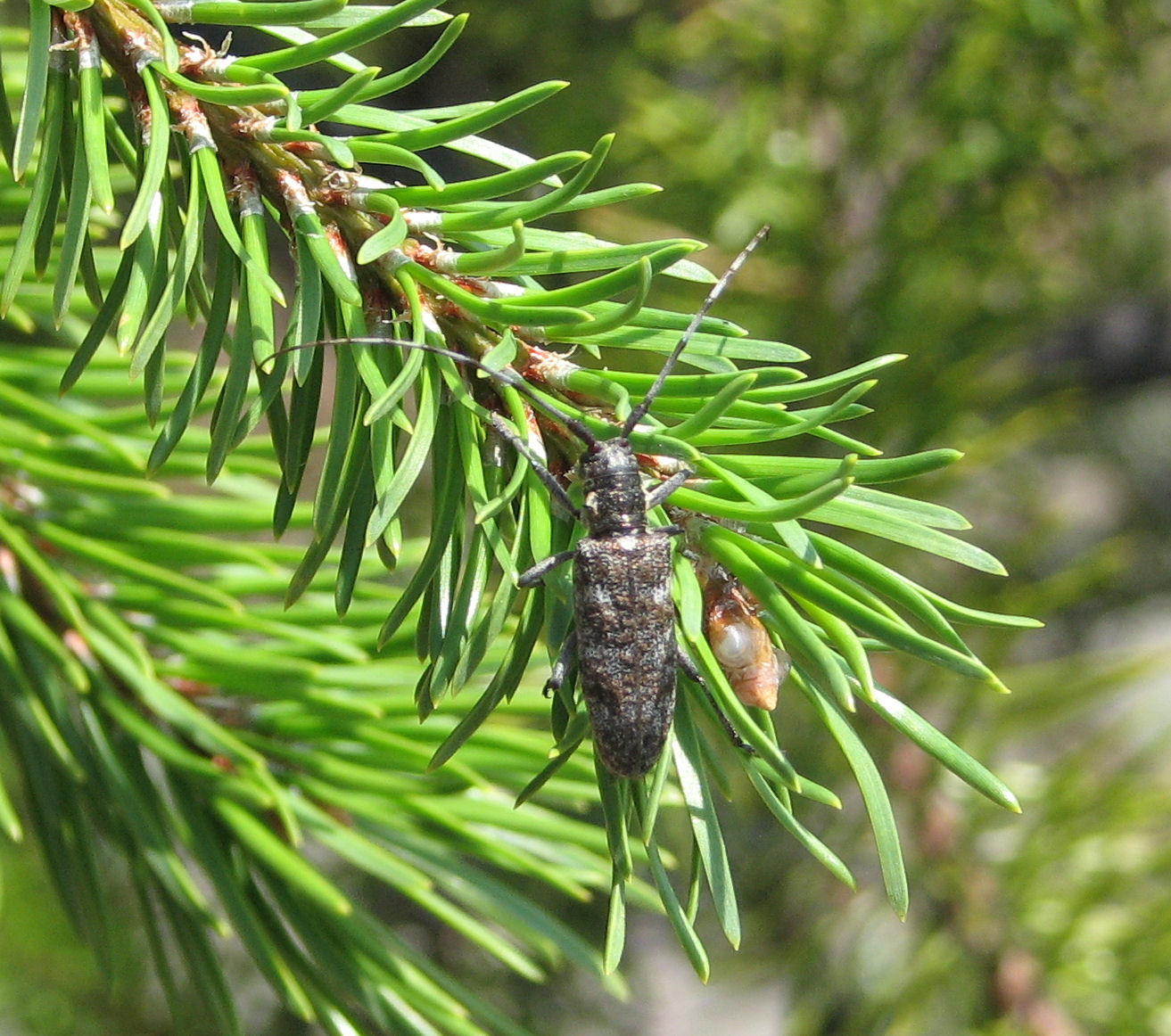
Spotted pine sawyer (M. maculosus)

- Monochamus abruptus Holzschuh, 2015
- Monochamus accri (Dillon & Dillon, 1959)
- Monochamus adamitus Thomson, 1857
- Monochamus affinis Breuning, 1938
- Monochamus alboapicalis (Pic, 1934)
- Monochamus alboscutellaris Breuning, 1977
- Monochamus alternatus Hope, 1842 – Japanese pine sawyer beetle
- Monochamus aparus (Jordan, 1903)
- Monochamus asiaticus (Hayashi, 1962)
- Monochamus asper Breuning, 1935
- Monochamus atrocoeruleogriseus Gilmour, 1956
- Monochamus balteatus Aurivillius, 1903
- Monochamus basifossulatus Breuning, 1938
- Monochamus basigranulatus Breuning, 1952
- Monochamus basilewskyi Breuning, 1952
- Monochamus benito (Dillon & Dillon, 1959)
- Monochamus bialbomaculatus Breuning, 1948
- Monochamus bimaculatus Gahan, 1888
- Monochamus binigricollis Breuning, 1965
- Monochamus binigromaculatus Breuning, 1959
- Monochamus blairi (Breuning, 1936)
- Monochamus bootangensis Breuning, 1947
- Monochamus borchmanni Breuning, 1959
- Monochamus buquetii (Thomson, 1858) [= tuberosus]
- Monochamus burgeoni Breuning, 1935
- Monochamus camerunensis Aurivillius, 1903
- Monochamus carolinensis (Olivier, 1792) – Carolina sawyer
- Monochamus clamator (LeConte, 1852) – spotted pine sawyer
- Monochamus conradti Breuning, 1961
- Monochamus convexicollis Gressitt, 1942
- Monochamus dayremi Breuning, 1935
- Monochamus densepunctatus Breuning, 1980
- Monochamus dentator (Fabricius, 1793)
- Monochamus desperatus Thomson, 1857
- Monochamus diores (Dillon & Dillon, 1959)
- Monochamus dubius (Gahan, 1894)
- Monochamus fisheri Breuning, 1944
- Monochamus flavosignatus Breuning, 1947
- Monochamus flavovittatus Breuning, 1935
- Monochamus foraminosus Holzschuh, 2015
- Monochamus foveatus Breuning, 1961
- Monochamus foveolatus Hintz, 1911 [= unicolor]
- Monochamus franzae (Dillon & Dillon, 1959)
- Monochamus galloprovincialis (Olivier, 1795) – black pine sawyer or timberman beetle
- Monochamus gardneri Breuning, 1938
- Monochamus grandis Waterhouse, 1881
- Monochamus granulipennis Breuning, 1949
- Monochamus gravidus (Pascoe, 1858)
- Monochamus griseoplagiatus Thomson, 1858 [= ochraceomaculatus]
- Monochamus guerryi Pic, 1903
- Monochamus guttulatus Gressitt, 1951
- Monochamus impluviatus Motschulsky, 1859
- Monochamus inexpectatus Breuning, 1935
- Monochamus irrorator (Chevrolat, 1855) [= plumbeus, ruficornis]
- Monochamus itzingeri Breuning, 1935
- Monochamus jordani Nonfried, 1894
- Monochamus karlitzingeri Tavakilian & Jiroux, 2015
- Monochamus kashitu (Dillon & Dillon, 1959)
- Monochamus kaszabi Heyrovský, 1955
- Monochamus kinabaluensis Hüdepohl, 1996
- Monochamus kivuensis Breuning, 1938
- Monochamus laevis Jordan, 1903
- Monochamus lamottei Lepesme & Breuning, 1952
- Monochamus latefasciatus Breuning, 1944
- Monochamus lepesmei Breuning, 1956
- Monochamus lineolatus (Dillon & Dillon, 1959)
- Monochamus lunifer (Aurivillius, 1891)
- Monochamus luteodispersus Pic, 1927
- Monochamus maculosus Haldeman, 1847 [= mutator] – spotted pine sawyer
- Monochamus marmorator Kirby in Richardson, 1837 – balsam fir sawyer
- Monochamus maruokai Hayashi, 1962
- Monochamus masaoi Kusama & Takakuwa, 1984
- Monochamus mausoni Breuning, 1950
- Monochamus mbai Lepesme & Breuning, 1953
- Monochamus mediomaculatus Breuning, 1935
- Monochamus melaleucus Jordan, 1903
- Monochamus mexicanus (Breuning, 1950)
- Monochamus millegranus Bates, 1891
- Monochamus murinus (Gahan, 1888)
- Monochamus nigrobasimaculatus Breuning, 1981
- Monochamus nigromaculatus Gressitt, 1942
- Monochamus nigromaculicollis Breuning, 1974
- Monochamus nigroplagiatus Breuning, 1935
- Monochamus nigrovittatus Breuning, 1938
- Monochamus nitens Bates, 1884
- Monochamus notatus (Drury, 1773) – northeastern sawyer or notable sawyer
- Monochamus obtusus Casey, 1891 – obtuse sawyer
- Monochamus ochreomarmoratus Breuning, 1960
- Monochamus ochreopunctatus Breuning, 1980
- Monochamus ochreosparsus Breuning, 1959
- Monochamus ochreosticticus Breuning, 1938
- Monochamus olivaceus Breuning, 1935
- Monochamus omias Jordan, 1903 [= africanus]
- Monochamus pentagonus Báguena, 1952
- Monochamus pheretes (Dillon & Dillon, 1961)
- Monochamus philomenus (Dillon & Dillon, 1959)
- Monochamus pictor (Bates, 1884)
- Monochamus principis Breuning, 1956
- Monochamus pseudotuberosus Breuning, 1936
- Monochamus quadriplagiatus Breuning, 1935
- Monochamus rectus Holzschuh, 2015
- Monochamus regularis (Aurivillius, 1924)
- Monochamus reticulatus (Dillon & Dillon, 1959)
- Monochamus rhodesianus Gilmour, 1956
- Monochamus roveroi Teocchi, Sudre & Jiroux, 2015
- Monochamus rubiginosus Teocchi, Sudre & Jiroux, 2014
- Monochamus ruspator (Fabricius, 1781)
- Monochamus saltuarius Gebler, 1830 – Sakhalin pine beetle
- Monochamus sargi (Bates, 1885)
- Monochamus sartor (Fabricius, 1787) [incl. subspecies urussovii] – black fir sawyer
- Monochamus scabiosus (Quedenfeldt, 1882) [= centralis]
- Monochamus scutellatus (Say, 1824) – white-spotted sawyer or spruce sawyer
- Monochamus semicirculus Báguena, 1952
- Monochamus semigranulatus (Pic, 1925)
- Monochamus serratus (Gahan, 1906)
- Monochamus shembaganurensis Breuning, 1979
- Monochamus similis Breuning, 1938
- Monochamus sparsutus Fairmaire, 1889
- Monochamus spectabilis (Perroud, 1855)
- Monochamus strandi Breuning, 1939
- Monochamus stuhlmanni Kolbe, 1894
- Monochamus subconvexicollis Breuning, 1967
- Monochamus subcribrosus Breuning, 1950
- Monochamus subfasciatus (Bates, 1873) [= fascioguttatus]
- Monochamus subgranulipennis Breuning, 1974
- Monochamus subtriangularis Breuning, 1971
- Monochamus sutor (Linnaeus, 1758) – pine sawyer
- Monochamus taiheizanensis Mitono, 1943
- Monochamus talianus Pic, 1912
- Monochamus thoas (Dillon & Dillon, 1961)
- Monochamus thomsoni (Chevrolat, 1855)
- Monochamus titillator (Fabricius, 1775) – southern pine sawyer
- Monochamus tonkinensis Breuning, 1935
- Monochamus transvaaliensis Gilmour, 1956
- Monochamus triangularis Breuning, 1935
- Monochamus tridentatus Chevrolat, 1833
- Monochamus tropicalis (Dillon & Dillon, 1961)
- Monochamus vagus (Gahan, 1888)
- Monochamus variegatus (Aurivillius, 1925)
- Monochamus verticalis (Fairmaire, 1901)
- Monochamus villiersi Breuning, 1960
- Monochamus x-fulvum Bates, 1884

== Gallery ==
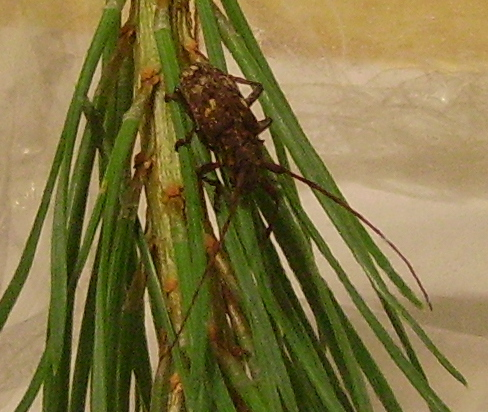

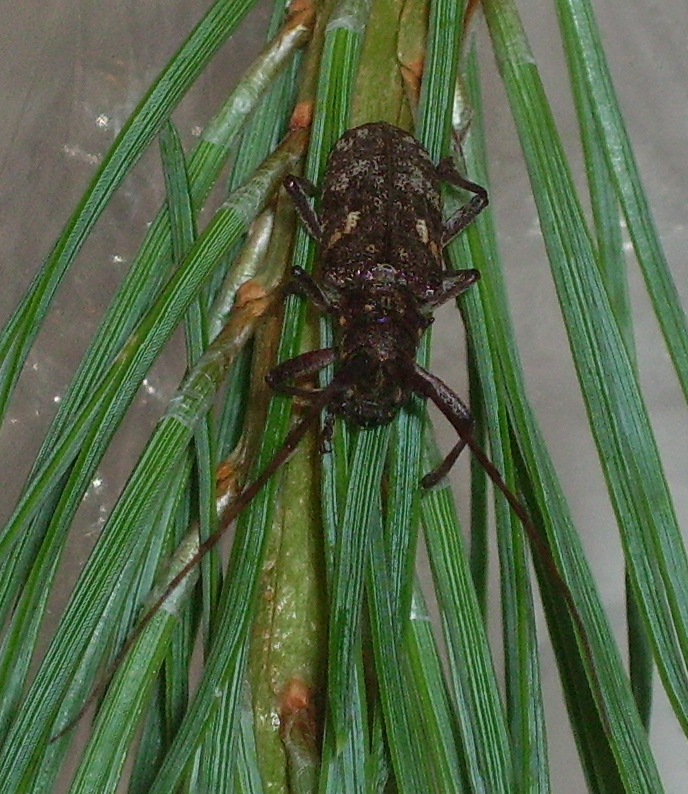

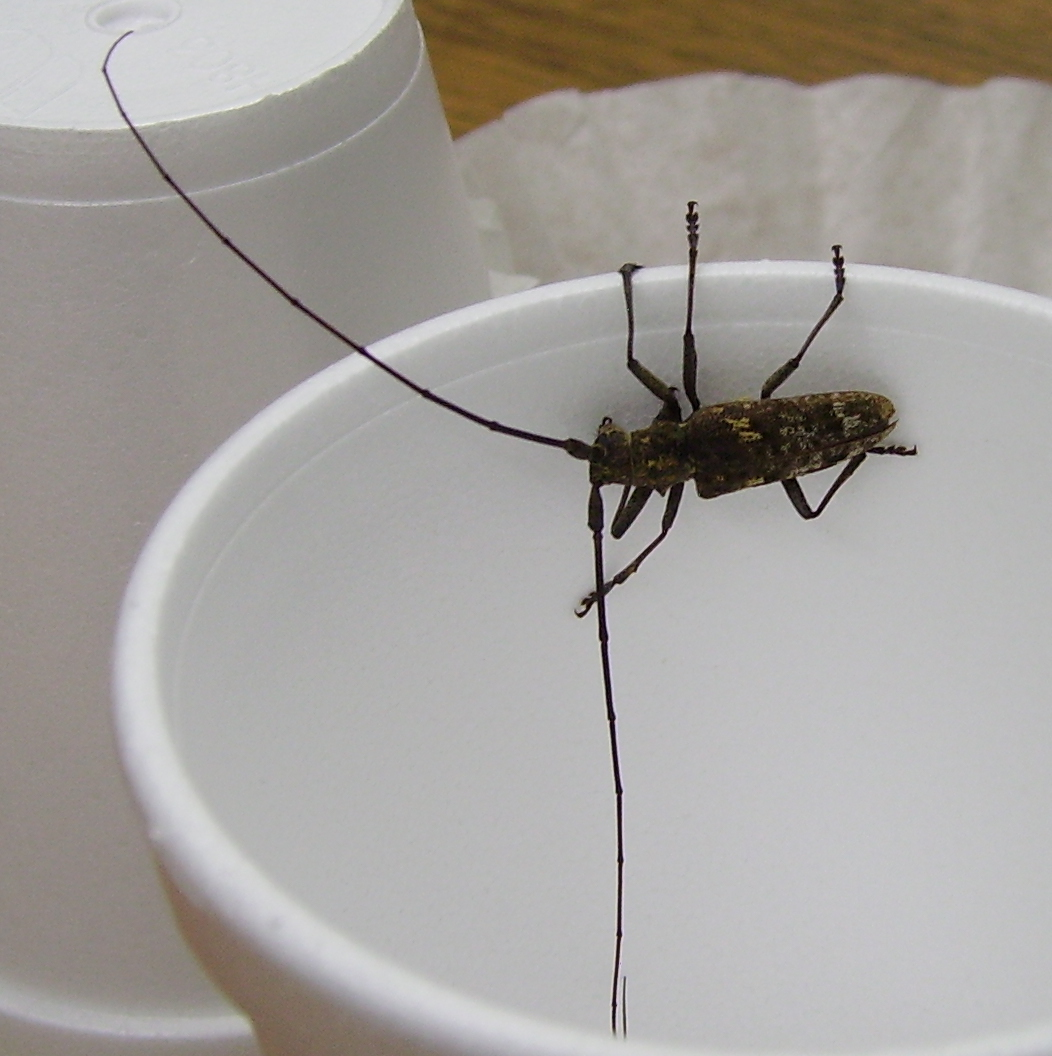

Three pictures of two separate sawyers found in a planting of Scots pines in Kansas.
