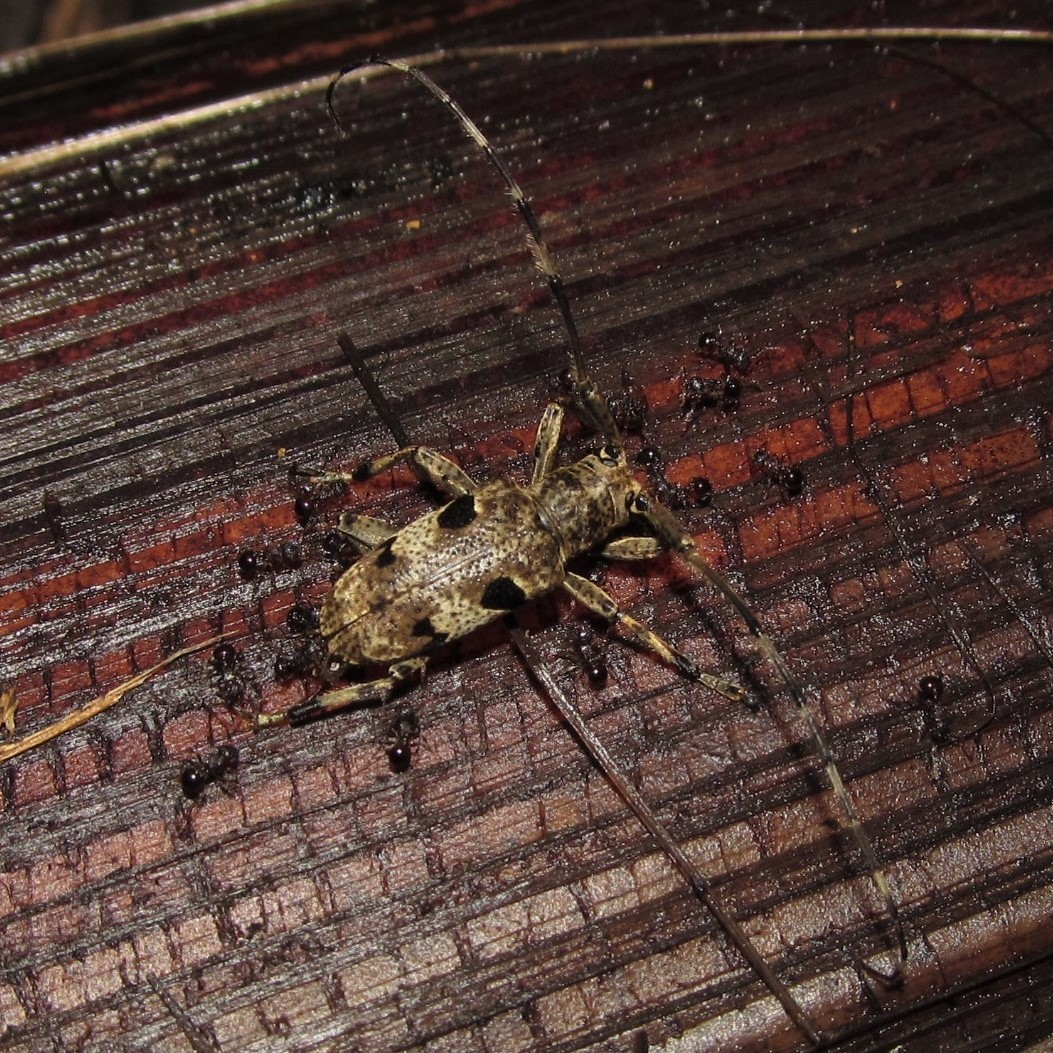

Scientific classification
- Kingdom: Animalia
- Phylum: Arthropoda
- Clade: Pancrustacea
- Class: Insecta
- Order: Coleoptera
- Suborder: Polyphaga
- Infraorder: Cucujiformia
- Family: Cerambycidae
- Genus: Mesosa
- Species: M. undata

Binomial name
- Mesosa undata (Fabricius, 1792)

Synonyms
- Cacia antennata White, 1858; Cerambyx undatus (Fabricius, 1792) nec Linnaeus, 1758; Lamia undata Fabricius, 1792

= Mesosa undata =

Species of beetle

Mesosa undata is a species of beetle in the family Cerambycidae. It was described by Johan Christian Fabricius in 1792, originally in the genus Lamia. It is known from Java and Laos.
