= Acalolepta lessonii =

Scientific classification
- Domain: Eukaryota
- Kingdom: Animalia
- Phylum: Arthropoda
- Class: Insecta
- Order: Coleoptera
- Suborder: Polyphaga
- Infraorder: Cucujiformia
- Family: Cerambycidae
- Tribe: Lamiini
- Genus: Acalolepta
- Species: A. lessonii

Binomial name
- Acalolepta lessonii (Montrouzier, 1855)

Synonyms
- Dihammus ammiralis Aurivillius, 1927; Lamia lessonii Montrouzier, 1855; Dihammus lessoni (Montrouzier, 1855) (misspelling)

Species of beetle

Acalolepta lessonii is a species of beetle in the family Cerambycidae. It was described by Xavier Montrouzier in 1855, originally under the genus Lamia.
