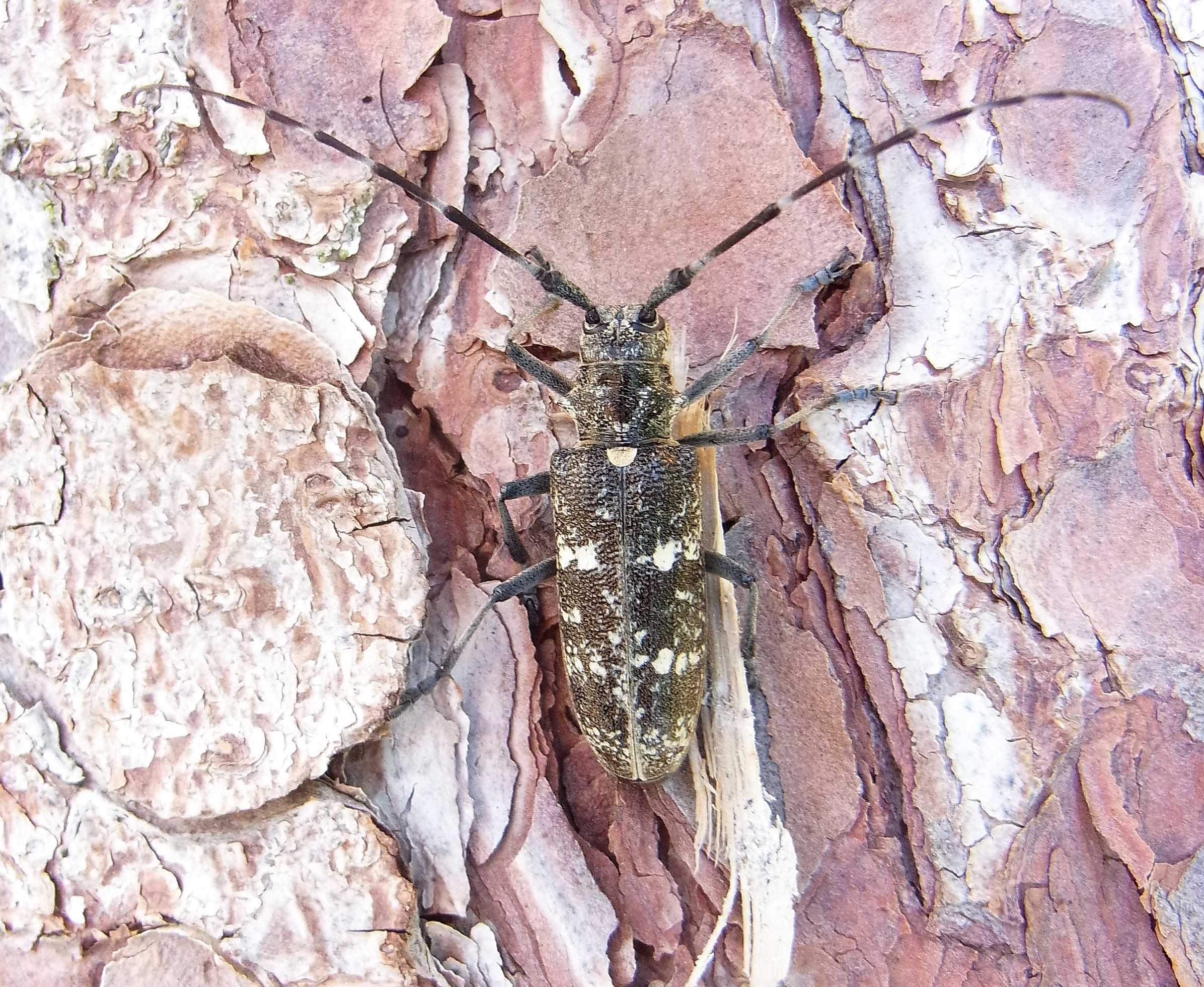

Scientific classification
- Kingdom: Animalia
- Phylum: Arthropoda
- Clade: Pancrustacea
- Class: Insecta
- Order: Coleoptera
- Suborder: Polyphaga
- Infraorder: Cucujiformia
- Family: Cerambycidae
- Genus: Monochamus
- Species: M. sartor

Binomial name
- Monochamus sartor (Fabricius, 1787)

Synonyms
- Lamia sartor Fabricius, 1787; Monohammus okenianus Gistel, 1857; Monochammus Mulsantii Seidlitz, 1891

= Monochamus sartor =

Species of beetle

Monochamus sartor is a species of beetle in the family Cerambycidae. It was first described by Johan Christian Fabricius in 1787, under the genus Lamia. It is known from throughout Europe, as well as in Kazakhstan, Mongolia, North Korea and South Korea. It is rated by the IUCN as Least Concern.

== Subspecies ==
- Monochamus sartor urussovii (Fischer von Waldheim, 1806) - fir sawyer beetle
- Monochamus sartor sartor (Fabricius, 1787) - sawyer beetle
