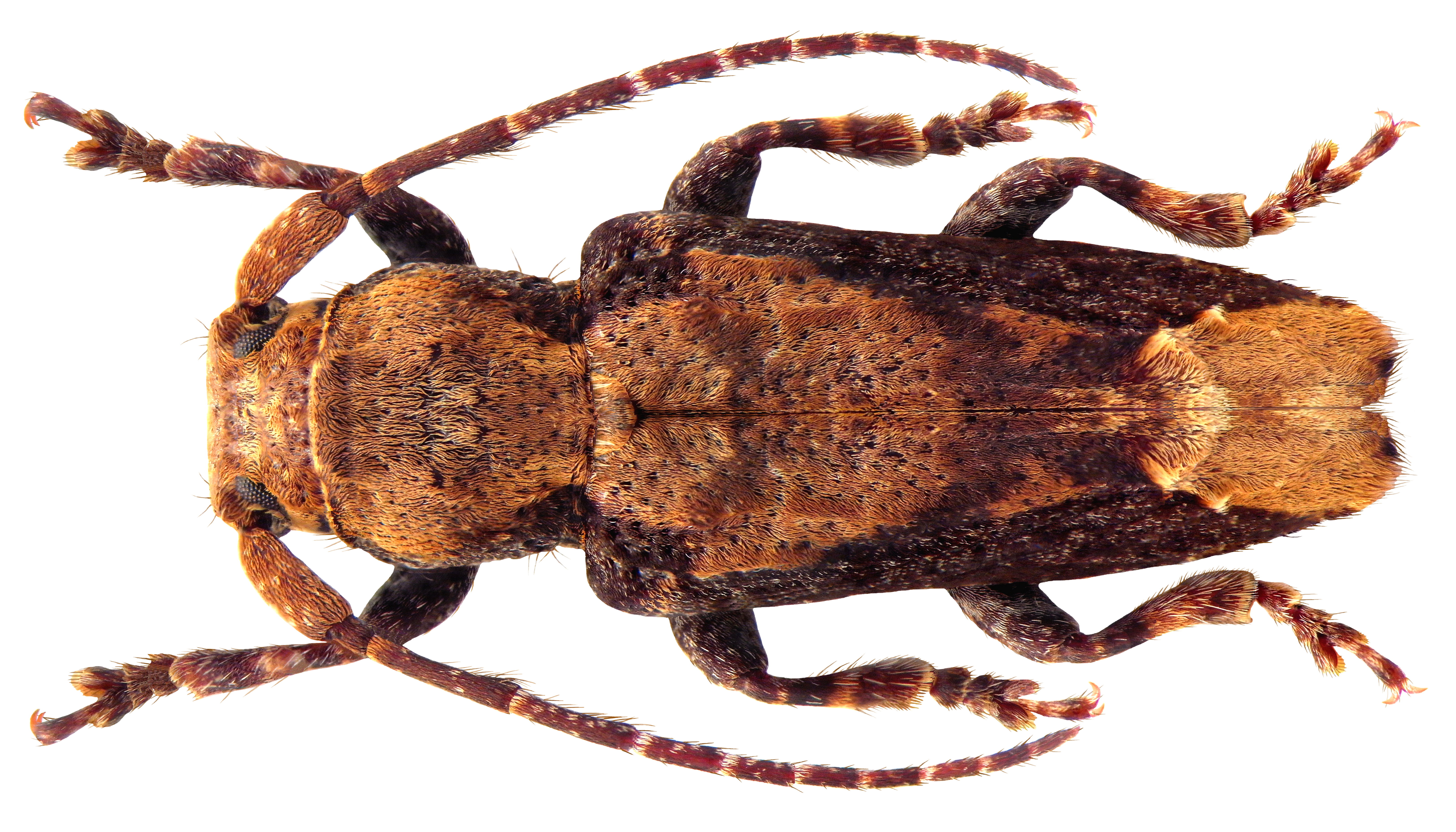

Scientific classification
- Kingdom: Animalia
- Phylum: Arthropoda
- Clade: Pancrustacea
- Class: Insecta
- Order: Coleoptera
- Suborder: Polyphaga
- Infraorder: Cucujiformia
- Family: Cerambycidae
- Genus: Pterolophia
- Species: P. crassipes

Binomial name
- Pterolophia crassipes (Wiedemann, 1823)

Synonyms
- Pterolophia imbuta Newman, 1842; Lamia crassipes Wiedemann, 1823; Praonetha iliaca Pascoe, 1865

= Pterolophia crassipes =

Species of beetle

Pterolophia crassipes is a species of beetle in the family Cerambycidae. It was described by Wiedemann in 1823, originally under the genus Lamia. It is known from Malaysia, the Philippines, Borneo, Java, and Sumatra.
