= Mesosa obscuricornis =

Scientific classification
- Kingdom: Animalia
- Phylum: Arthropoda
- Class: Insecta
- Order: Coleoptera
- Suborder: Polyphaga
- Infraorder: Cucujiformia
- Family: Cerambycidae
- Genus: Mesosa
- Species: M. obscuricornis

Binomial name
- Mesosa obscuricornis Pic, 1894

Synonyms
- Aphelocnemia obscuricornis (Pic, 1894); Mesosa nebulosa obscuricornis Pic, 1894; Mesosa nebulosa var. obscuricornis Pic, 1894

Species of beetle

Mesosa obscuricornis is a species of beetle in the family Cerambycidae. It was described by Maurice Pic in 1894, originally as a varietas of M. nebulosa. It is known from Iran, Azerbaijan, and Turkey.
