= Eutaenia trifasciella =

Scientific classification
- Kingdom: Animalia
- Phylum: Arthropoda
- Class: Insecta
- Order: Coleoptera
- Suborder: Polyphaga
- Infraorder: Cucujiformia
- Family: Cerambycidae
- Genus: Eutaenia
- Species: E. trifasciella

Binomial name
- Eutaenia trifasciella (White, 1850)

Synonyms
- Ceroplesis javeti Thomson, 1857; Coelosterna trifasciella (White, 1850); Eutaeniopsis trifasciella (White, 1850; Lamia (Cerasterna) trifasciella White, 1850

Species of beetle

Eutaenia trifasciella is a species of beetle in the family Cerambycidae. It was described by White in 1850, originally under the genus Lamia. It is known from Laos, China, Vietnam and Malaysia.
