= Acalolepta rusticatrix =

Scientific classification
- Kingdom: Animalia
- Phylum: Arthropoda
- Clade: Pancrustacea
- Class: Insecta
- Order: Coleoptera
- Suborder: Polyphaga
- Infraorder: Cucujiformia
- Family: Cerambycidae
- Genus: Acalolepta
- Species: A. rusticatrix

Binomial name
- Acalolepta rusticatrix (Fabricius, 1801)

Synonyms
- Dihammus rusticator (Fabricius, 1801); Lamia fistulator Germar, 1824; Lamia rusticator Fabricius, 1801; Monochamus fistulator (Germar, 1824); Monohammus bianor Newman, 1842

Audio
- Acalolepta rusticatrix sound

Species of beetle

Acalolepta rusticatrix is a species of beetle in the family Cerambycidae. It was described by Johan Christian Fabricius in 1801, originally under the genus Lamia. It is known from Myanmar, India, the Philippines, Malaysia, Sumatra, Sri Lanka, Java, Taiwan, Indonesia, Sulawesi, and Vietnam.

== Subspecies ==
- Acalolepta rusticatrix bilitonensis (Breuning, 1953)
- Acalolepta rusticatrix formosensis Breuning & Ohbayashi, 1966 – endemic to Taiwan
- Acalolepta rusticatrix lombokensis Breuning, 1982
- Acalolepta rusticatrix rusticatrix (Fabricius, 1801)
- Acalolepta rusticatrix sumbawensis Breuning, 1970
