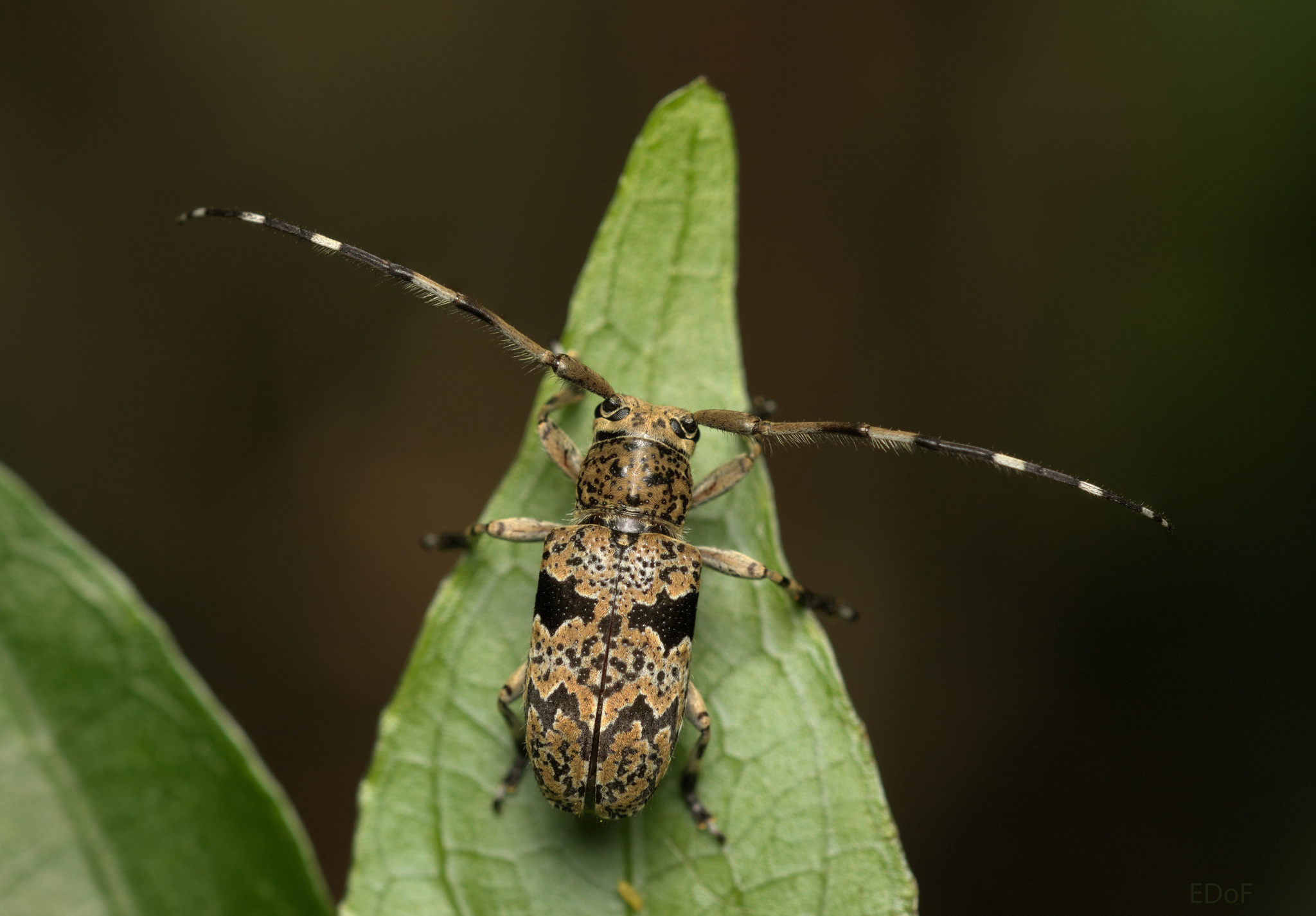
- Mesosa rupta in Hong Kong

Scientific classification
- Kingdom: Animalia
- Phylum: Arthropoda
- Class: Insecta
- Order: Coleoptera
- Suborder: Polyphaga
- Infraorder: Cucujiformia
- Family: Cerambycidae
- Genus: Mesosa
- Species: M. rupta

Binomial name
- Mesosa rupta (Pascoe, 1862)

Synonyms
- Agelasta rupta Pascoe, 1862; Helixoea rupta (Pascoe, 1862); Mesosa unifasciata Pic, 1922; Mimocoptops nigrobifasciata Pic, 1925

= Mesosa rupta =

Species of beetle

Mesosa rupta is a species of beetle in the family Cerambycidae. It was described by Francis Polkinghorne Pascoe in 1862, originally under the genus Agelasta. It is known from Vietnam, Cambodia and Laos.
