= Mesosa latifasciata =

Scientific classification
- Kingdom: Animalia
- Phylum: Arthropoda
- Class: Insecta
- Order: Coleoptera
- Suborder: Polyphaga
- Infraorder: Cucujiformia
- Family: Cerambycidae
- Genus: Mesosa
- Species: M. latifasciata

Binomial name
- Mesosa latifasciata (White, 1858)

Synonyms
- Cacia latifasciata White, 1858; Mesosa luteopubens Pic, 1917

Species of beetle

Mesosa latifasciata is a species of beetle in the family Cerambycidae. It was described by White in 1858, originally under the genus Cacia. It is known from Taiwan, Vietnam and China.
