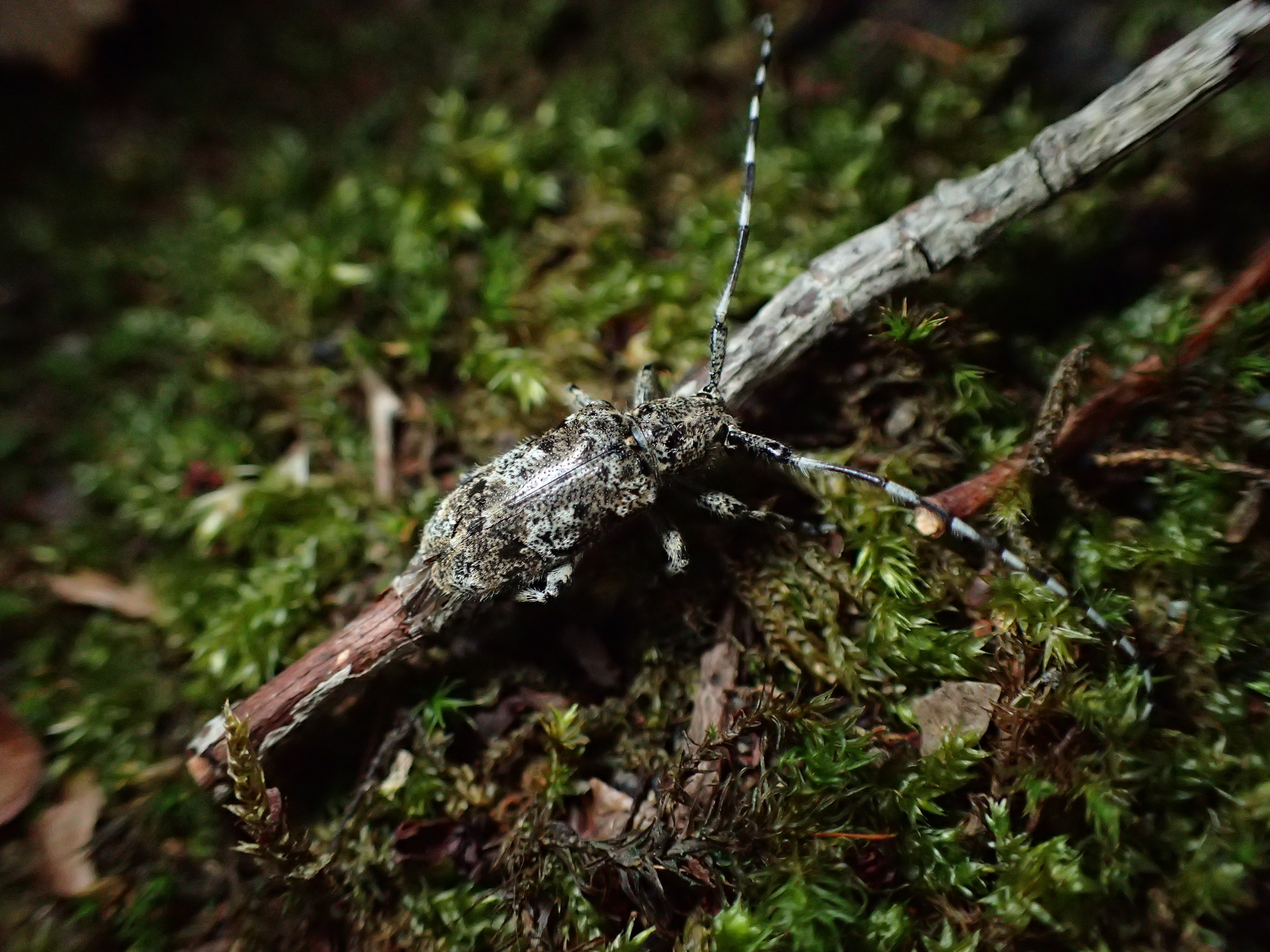

Scientific classification
- Kingdom: Animalia
- Phylum: Arthropoda
- Class: Insecta
- Order: Coleoptera
- Suborder: Polyphaga
- Infraorder: Cucujiformia
- Family: Cerambycidae
- Genus: Mesosa
- Species: M. hirsuta

Binomial name
- Mesosa hirsuta Bates, 1884

= Mesosa hirsuta =

Species of beetle

Mesosa hirsuta is a species of beetle in the family Cerambycidae. It was described by Henry Walter Bates in 1884. It is known from Japan and China.

== Subspecies ==
- Mesosa hirsuta albihirsuta Kusama & Takakuwa, 1984
- Mesosa hirsuta brevihirsuta Makihara, 1980
- Mesosa hirsuta continentalis Hayashi, 1964
- Mesosa hirsuta hirsuta Bates, 1884
- Mesosa hirsuta konishii Hayashi, 1965
