= Mesosa affinis =

Scientific classification
- Kingdom: Animalia
- Phylum: Arthropoda
- Class: Insecta
- Order: Coleoptera
- Suborder: Polyphaga
- Infraorder: Cucujiformia
- Family: Cerambycidae
- Genus: Mesosa
- Species: M. affinis

Binomial name
- Mesosa affinis Breuning, 1936

Species of beetle

Mesosa affinis is a species of beetle in the family Cerambycidae. It was described by Stephan von Breuning in 1936. It is known from Nepal and Bhutan.

== Subspecies ==
- Mesosa affinis affinis Breuning, 1936
- Mesosa affinis nepalica Holzschuh, 2003
