= Mesosa albofasciata =

Scientific classification
- Kingdom: Animalia
- Phylum: Arthropoda
- Class: Insecta
- Order: Coleoptera
- Suborder: Polyphaga
- Infraorder: Cucujiformia
- Family: Cerambycidae
- Genus: Mesosa
- Species: M. albofasciata

Binomial name
- Mesosa albofasciata (Breuning, 1935)

Synonyms
- Saimia albofasciata Breuning, 1935

Species of beetle

Mesosa albofasciata is a species of longhorn beetle in the family Cerambycidae, in genus Mesosa. It was described by Stephan von Breuning in 1935. It is known from India.
