= Mesosa inaequalipennis =

Scientific classification
- Kingdom: Animalia
- Phylum: Arthropoda
- Class: Insecta
- Order: Coleoptera
- Suborder: Polyphaga
- Infraorder: Cucujiformia
- Family: Cerambycidae
- Genus: Mesosa
- Species: M. inaequalipennis

Binomial name
- Mesosa inaequalipennis Pic, 1944

Species of beetle

Mesosa inaequalipennis is a species of beetle in the family Cerambycidae. It was described by Maurice Pic in 1944. It was first described in Vietnam.
