= Mesosa stictica =

Scientific classification
- Kingdom: Animalia
- Phylum: Arthropoda
- Class: Insecta
- Order: Coleoptera
- Suborder: Polyphaga
- Infraorder: Cucujiformia
- Family: Cerambycidae
- Genus: Mesosa
- Species: M. stictica

Binomial name
- Mesosa stictica Blanchard, 1871

Synonyms
- Mesosa oculicollis Fairmaire, 1878

Species of beetle

Mesosa stictica is a species of beetle in the family Cerambycidae. It was described by Blanchard in 1871. It is known from China.

== Subspecies ==
- Mesosa stictica rugosa Gressitt, 1953
- Mesosa stictica stictica Blanchard, 1871
