= Mesosa pictipes =

Scientific classification
- Kingdom: Animalia
- Phylum: Arthropoda
- Class: Insecta
- Order: Coleoptera
- Suborder: Polyphaga
- Infraorder: Cucujiformia
- Family: Cerambycidae
- Genus: Mesosa
- Species: M. pictipes

Binomial name
- Mesosa pictipes Gressitt, 1937

Synonyms
- Mesosa (Saimia) pictipes (Gressitt) Breuning, 1938

Species of beetle

Mesosa pictipes is a species of beetle in the family Cerambycidae. It was described by Gressitt in 1937. It is known from Japan.

== Subspecies ==
- Mesosa pictipes miyamotoi Hayashi, 1956
- Mesosa pictipes pictipes Gressitt, 1937
