= Mesosa albidorsalis =

Scientific classification
- Kingdom: Animalia
- Phylum: Arthropoda
- Class: Insecta
- Order: Coleoptera
- Suborder: Polyphaga
- Infraorder: Cucujiformia
- Family: Cerambycidae
- Genus: Mesosa
- Species: M. albidorsalis

Binomial name
- Mesosa albidorsalis (Pascoe, 1865)

Synonyms
- Saimia albidorsalis Pascoe, 1865

Species of beetle

Mesosa albidorsalis is a species of beetle in the family Cerambycidae. It was described by Francis Polkinghorne Pascoe in 1865. It is known from Borneo, the Philippines, Singapore and Malaysia.
