= Mesosa rosa =

Scientific classification
- Domain: Eukaryota
- Kingdom: Animalia
- Phylum: Arthropoda
- Class: Insecta
- Order: Coleoptera
- Suborder: Polyphaga
- Infraorder: Cucujiformia
- Family: Cerambycidae
- Genus: Mesosa
- Species: M. rosa

Binomial name
- Mesosa rosa Karsch, 1882

Subspecies
- Mesosa rosa rosa; Mesosa rosa coorgensis

Species of beetle

Mesosa rosa is a species of beetle in the family Cerambycidae. It is native to Sri Lanka and India. It was described by Ferdinand Karsch in 1882 and has two recognized subspecies.

== Taxonomy ==
Mesosa rosa is a longhorn beetle (family Cerambycidae). First described by Ferdinand Karsch in 1882 from a type specimen from Sri Lanka (then referred to as Ceylon), it was divided into two subspecies in 1968 when Stephan von Breuning noted a newly discovered variant, Mesosa rosa coorgensis, which diverged from earlier-known specimens that were sorted into the autonymous subspecies Mesosa rosa rosa. The type locality of M. r. rosa is Colombo, Sri Lanka, while M. r. coorgensis is named for its type locality, the former Coorg Province of British India.

The subfamily is Lamiinae (the flat-faced longhorn beetles), and the subgenus is Aplocnemia (formerly Aphelocnemia). The first Cerambycidae ancestors appeared in the Late Jurassic (circa 150.9 million years ago) and the first Lamiinae ancestors appeared in the Early Cretaceous (132.0 mya).

== Ecology ==
M. rosa is only found in Sri Lanka and India. First discovered in Sri Lanka, as described by Karsch, the beetle was first documented to occur in India in 1939 by von Breuning.

A 2021 study noted M. rosa to be a woodboring beetle, as it found the beetle attacking the tree species Mallotus philippensis in Taliparamba, Kerala, India.

As a longhorn beetle, M. rosa is characterized by an elongated body with very long, simple antennae, prominent eyes, and robust mandibles; the larvae are elongated and near-cylindrical with a covering of setae and sclerotized mouthparts.
