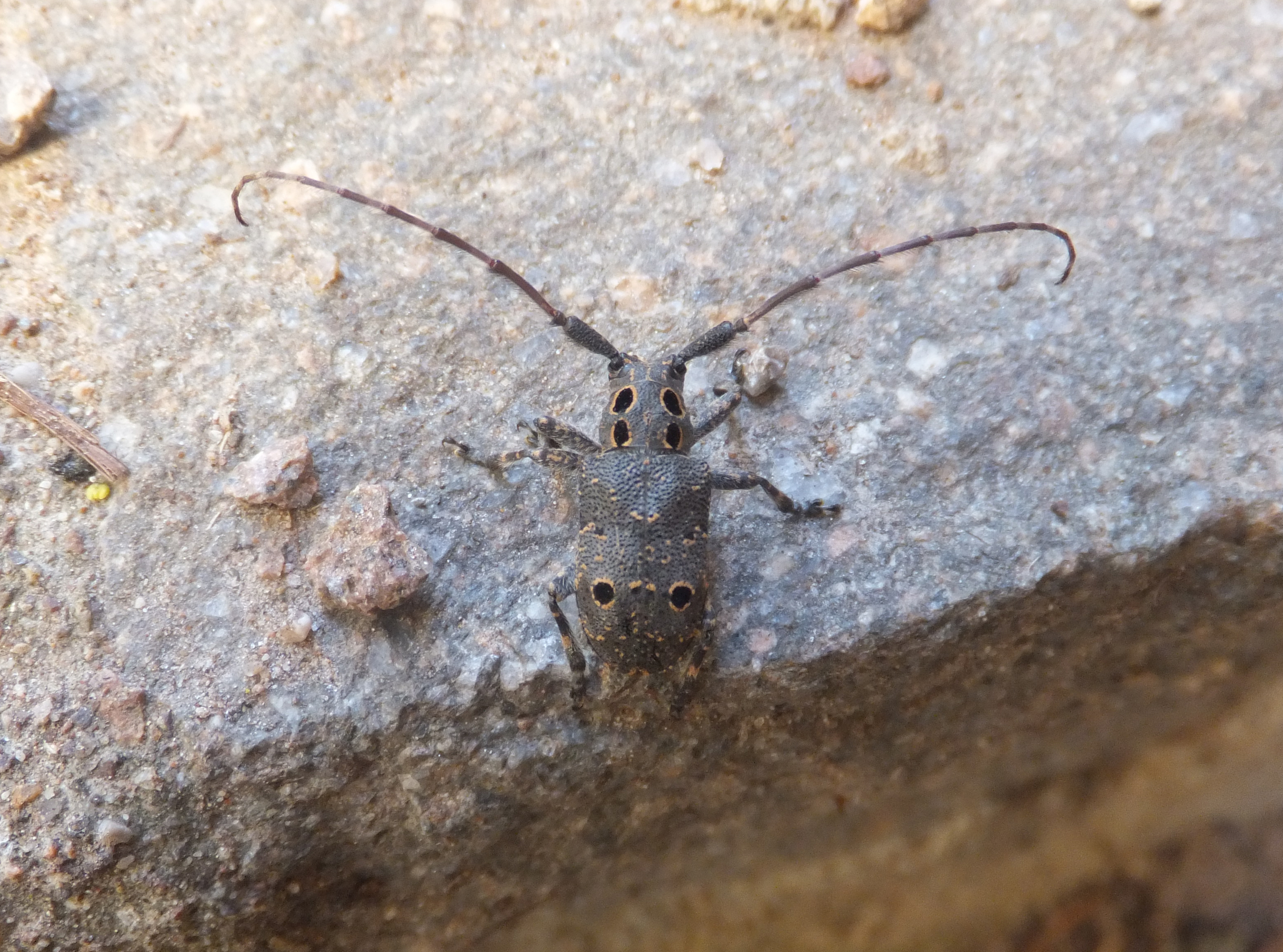

Scientific classification
- Kingdom: Animalia
- Phylum: Arthropoda
- Class: Insecta
- Order: Coleoptera
- Suborder: Polyphaga
- Infraorder: Cucujiformia
- Family: Cerambycidae
- Genus: Mesosa
- Species: M. curculionoides

Binomial name
- Mesosa curculionoides (Linnaeus, 1761)

Synonyms
- Cerambyx curculionoides Linnaeus, 1761; Haplocnemia curculionoides (Linnaeus, 1761); Lamia curculionoides (Linnaeus, 1761); Cerambyx argus Voet, 1781 (Unav.); Leptura oculata Geoffroy, 1785; Leptura curculioides Auctt. (Missp.); Mesosa curculionides Bach, 1856 (Missp.); Mesosa curculionides ab. confluens Hänel, 1940 (Unav.)

= Mesosa curculionoides =

Species of beetle

Mesosa curculionoides is a species of beetle in the family Cerambycidae, and the type species of its genus. It was described by Carl Linnaeus in 1761, originally under the genus Cerambyx. It has a wide distribution throughout Europe and in the Caucasus, and is also known from South Korea. It was formerly found in Belgium, where it is now extinct. It measures between 10 and 17 mm (0.39 and 0.67 in).

M. curculionoides feeds on Larix decidua, Abies alba, Corylus avellana, Fagus sylvatica, and Castanea sativa.

== Varietas ==
- Mesosa curculionoides var. biloculata (Nicolas, 1902)
- Mesosa curculionoides var. tokatensis (Pic, 1904)
