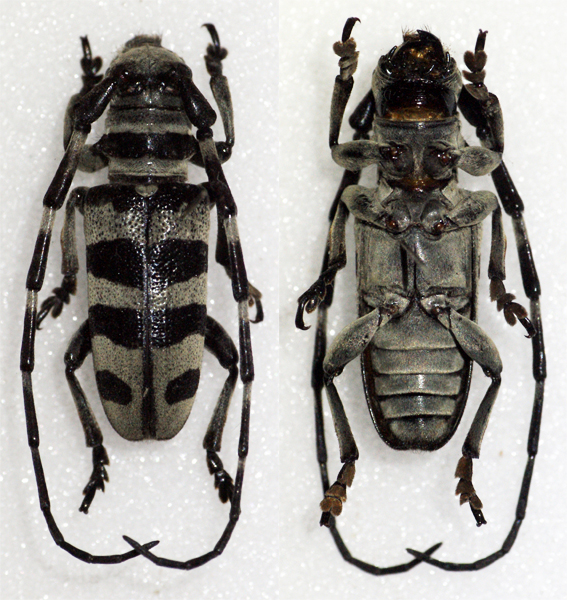

Scientific classification
- Kingdom: Animalia
- Phylum: Arthropoda
- Class: Insecta
- Order: Coleoptera
- Suborder: Polyphaga
- Infraorder: Cucujiformia
- Family: Cerambycidae
- Genus: Eutaenia
- Species: E. oberthueri

Binomial name
- Eutaenia oberthueri Gahan, 1895

= Eutaenia oberthueri =

Species of beetle

Eutaenia oberthueri is a species of beetle in the family Cerambycidae. It was described by Charles Joseph Gahan in 1895. It is known from Malaysia, India and Myanmar.
