= Mesosa rondoni =

Scientific classification
- Kingdom: Animalia
- Phylum: Arthropoda
- Class: Insecta
- Order: Coleoptera
- Suborder: Polyphaga
- Infraorder: Cucujiformia
- Family: Cerambycidae
- Genus: Mesosa
- Species: M. rondoni

Binomial name
- Mesosa rondoni Breuning, 1962

Synonyms
- Mesosa rondoni m. parvula Breuning, 1968

Species of beetle

Mesosa rondoni is a species of beetle in the family Cerambycidae. It was described by Stephan von Breuning in 1962. It is known from Laos.

== Subspecies ==
- Mesosa rondoni rondoni Breuning, 1962
- Mesosa rondoni paravariegata Rondon & Breuning, 1970
