= Mesosa subrupta =

Scientific classification
- Kingdom: Animalia
- Phylum: Arthropoda
- Class: Insecta
- Order: Coleoptera
- Suborder: Polyphaga
- Infraorder: Cucujiformia
- Family: Cerambycidae
- Genus: Mesosa
- Species: M. subrupta

Binomial name
- Mesosa subrupta Breuning, 1968

Species of beetle

Mesosa subrupta is a species of beetle in the family Cerambycidae. It was described by Stephan von Breuning in 1968. It is known to be found in Vietnam.
