= Mesosa biplagiata =

Scientific classification
- Kingdom: Animalia
- Phylum: Arthropoda
- Clade: Pancrustacea
- Class: Insecta
- Order: Coleoptera
- Suborder: Polyphaga
- Infraorder: Cucujiformia
- Family: Cerambycidae
- Genus: Mesosa
- Species: M. biplagiata

Binomial name
- Mesosa biplagiata (Breuning, 1935)

Synonyms
- Saimia biplagiata Breuning, 1935

Species of beetle

Mesosa biplagiata is a species of beetle in the family Cerambycidae. It was described by Stephan von Breuning in 1935. It is known from Java.
