= Mesosa seminivea =

Scientific classification
- Kingdom: Animalia
- Phylum: Arthropoda
- Class: Insecta
- Order: Coleoptera
- Suborder: Polyphaga
- Infraorder: Cucujiformia
- Family: Cerambycidae
- Genus: Mesosa
- Species: M. seminivea

Binomial name
- Mesosa seminivea Breuning, 1965

Species of beetle

Mesosa seminivea is a species of beetle in the family Cerambycidae. It was described by Stephan von Breuning in 1965. It is known from Laos.
