= Mesosa hirticornis =

Scientific classification
- Kingdom: Animalia
- Phylum: Arthropoda
- Class: Insecta
- Order: Coleoptera
- Suborder: Polyphaga
- Infraorder: Cucujiformia
- Family: Cerambycidae
- Genus: Mesosa
- Species: M. hirticornis

Binomial name
- Mesosa hirticornis (Gressitt, 1936)

Synonyms
- Agelasta (Parasaimia) hirticornis (Gressitt) Breuning, 1939; Saimia? hirticornis Gressitt, 1936

Species of beetle

Mesosa hirticornis is a species of beetle in the family Cerambycidae. It was described by Gressitt in 1936, originally under the genus Saimia. It is known from Taiwan.
