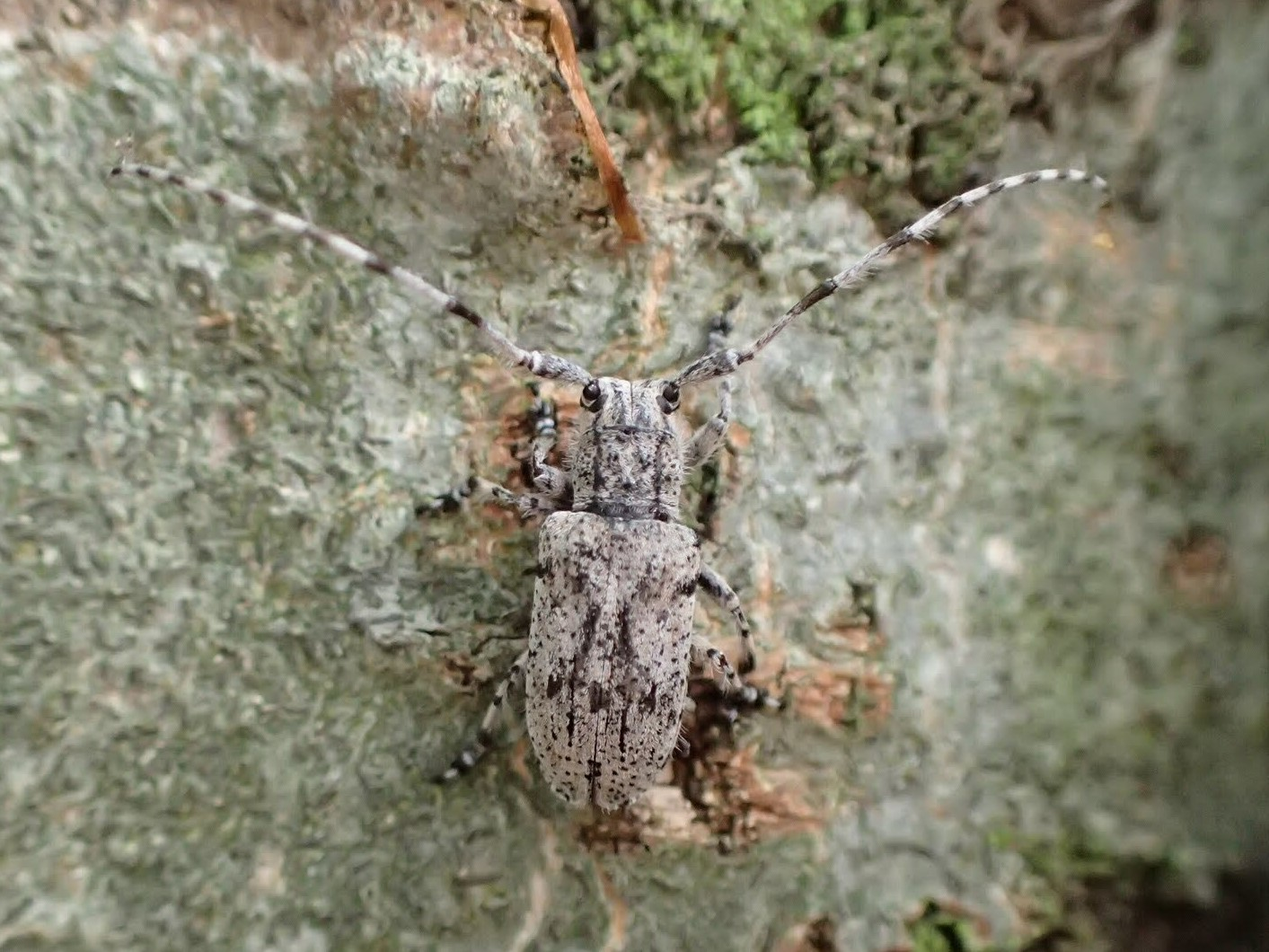

Scientific classification
- Kingdom: Animalia
- Phylum: Arthropoda
- Class: Insecta
- Order: Coleoptera
- Suborder: Polyphaga
- Infraorder: Cucujiformia
- Family: Cerambycidae
- Genus: Mesosa
- Species: M. senilis

Binomial name
- Mesosa senilis Bates, 1884

= Mesosa senilis =

Species of beetle

Mesosa senilis is a species of beetle in the family Cerambycidae. It was described by Henry Walter Bates in 1884. It is known from Japan and Sakhalin.
