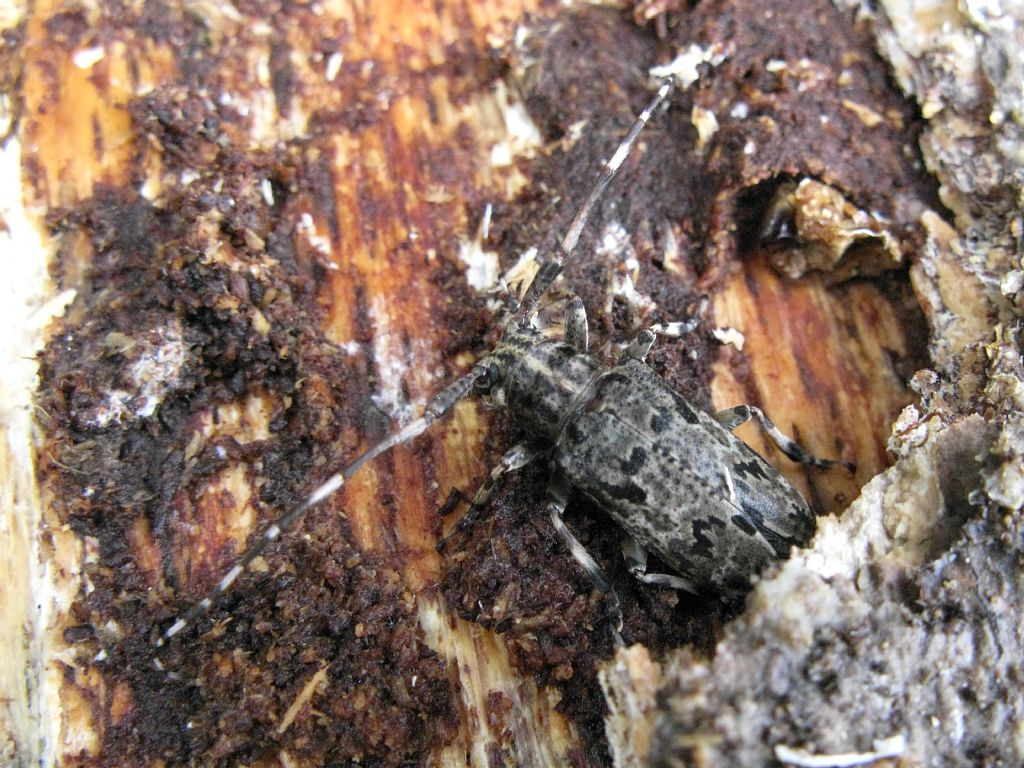

Scientific classification
- Kingdom: Animalia
- Phylum: Arthropoda
- Class: Insecta
- Order: Coleoptera
- Suborder: Polyphaga
- Infraorder: Cucujiformia
- Family: Cerambycidae
- Genus: Mesosa
- Species: M. longipennis

Binomial name
- Mesosa longipennis Bates, 1873

Synonyms
- Mesosa (Saimia) amakusae Breuning, 1964

= Mesosa longipennis =

Species of beetle

Mesosa longipennis is a species of beetle in the family Cerambycidae. It was described by Henry Walter Bates in 1873. It is known from Taiwan, Russia, South Korea, China, and Japan. It contains the varietas Mesosa longipennis var. subobliterata.

M. longipennis feeds on Ailanthus altissima.
