= Mesosa kuntzeni =

Scientific classification
- Kingdom: Animalia
- Phylum: Arthropoda
- Class: Insecta
- Order: Coleoptera
- Suborder: Polyphaga
- Infraorder: Cucujiformia
- Family: Cerambycidae
- Genus: Mesosa
- Species: M. kuntzeni

Binomial name
- Mesosa kuntzeni Matsushita, 1933

Species of beetle

Mesosa kuntzeni is a species of beetle in the family Cerambycidae. It was described by Masaki Matsushita in 1933. It is known from Taiwan.
