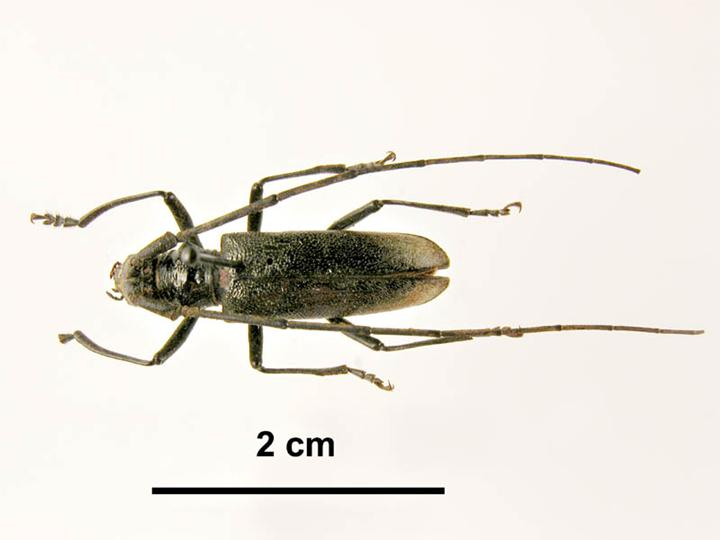

Scientific classification
- Domain: Eukaryota
- Kingdom: Animalia
- Phylum: Arthropoda
- Class: Insecta
- Order: Coleoptera
- Suborder: Polyphaga
- Infraorder: Cucujiformia
- Family: Cerambycidae
- Tribe: Lamiini
- Genus: Monochamus
- Species: M. sartor
- Subspecies: M. s. urussovii

Trinomial name
- Monochamus sartor urussovii (Fischer von Waldheim, 1806)

Synonyms
- Cerambyx Urussovii Fischer von Waldheim, 1806; Monohammus quadrimaculatus Motschulsky, 1845; Monochamus Rosenmülleri var. Schaufusi Pic, 1912 (Unav.); Monochamus urussovi Breuning, 1961 (Missp.); Monochamus urussovi m. schaufussi Breuning, 1961 (Unav.); Monochamus urussovi m. takaii Breuning, 1961 (Unav.)

= Monochamus sartor urussovii =

Subspecies of insect

Monochamus sartor urussovii is a subspecies of beetle in the family Cerambycidae. It was described by Fischer von Waldheim in 1806. It has been recorded in Eastern and Northern Europe and Northern Asia. It is a vector of the nematode Bursaphelenchus mucronatus. Larvae burrow into the wood of various conifer species and can be a tree pest, as feeding damage reduces the value of the timber.
