= Mesosa pardina =

Scientific classification
- Kingdom: Animalia
- Phylum: Arthropoda
- Class: Insecta
- Order: Coleoptera
- Suborder: Polyphaga
- Infraorder: Cucujiformia
- Family: Cerambycidae
- Genus: Mesosa
- Species: M. pardina

Binomial name
- Mesosa pardina Heller, 1926

Synonyms
- Saimia pardina Heller, 1926

Species of beetle

Mesosa pardina is a species of beetle in the family Cerambycidae. It was described by Heller in 1926. It is known from the Philippines.
