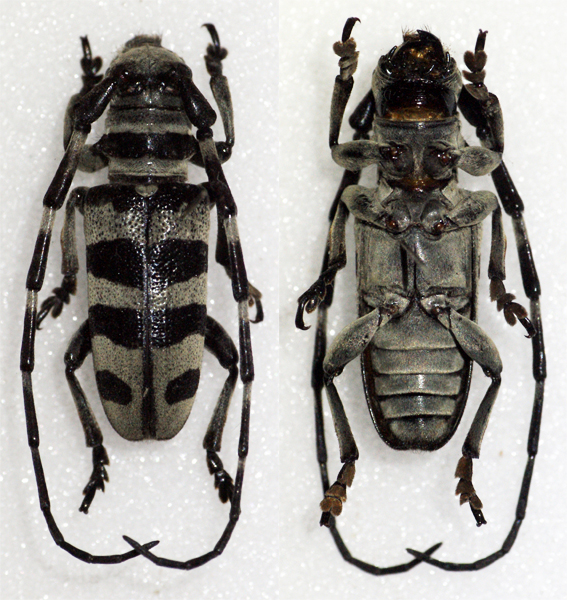
- Eutaenia oberthueri

Scientific classification
- Kingdom: Animalia
- Phylum: Arthropoda
- Class: Insecta
- Order: Coleoptera
- Suborder: Polyphaga
- Infraorder: Cucujiformia
- Family: Cerambycidae
- Tribe: Lamiini
- Genus: Eutaenia

= Eutaenia (beetle) =

Genus of beetles

Eutaenia is a genus of longhorn beetles of the subfamily Lamiinae, containing the following species:

- Eutaenia alboampliata Breuning, 1964
- Eutaenia albomaculata Breuning, 1935
- Eutaenia borneensis Aurivillius, 1911
- Eutaenia corbetti Gahan, 1893
- Eutaenia formosana Matsushita, 1941
- Eutaenia oberthueri Gahan, 1895
- Eutaenia trifasciella (White, 1850)
