= Mesosa alternata =

Scientific classification
- Kingdom: Animalia
- Phylum: Arthropoda
- Class: Insecta
- Order: Coleoptera
- Suborder: Polyphaga
- Infraorder: Cucujiformia
- Family: Cerambycidae
- Genus: Mesosa
- Species: M. alternata

Binomial name
- Mesosa alternata (Breuning, 1936)

Synonyms
- Saimia alternata Breuning, 1936

Species of beetle

Mesosa alternata is a species of beetle in the family Cerambycidae. It was described by Stephan von Breuning in 1936. It is known from Taiwan, China and Malaysia.
