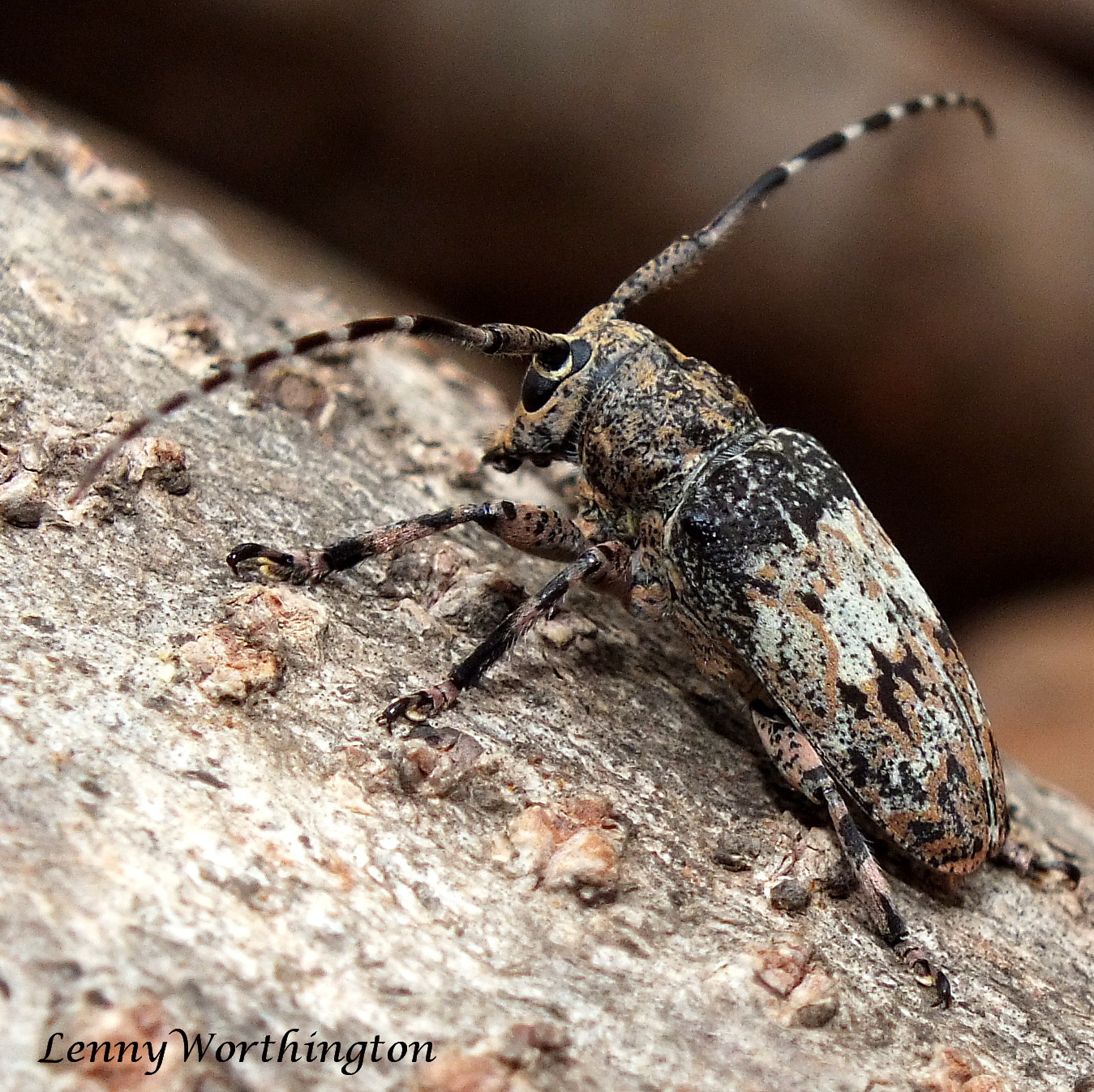
- Mesosa postmarmorata

Scientific classification
- Kingdom: Animalia
- Phylum: Arthropoda
- Class: Insecta
- Order: Coleoptera
- Suborder: Polyphaga
- Infraorder: Cucujiformia
- Family: Cerambycidae
- Genus: Mesosa
- Species: M. postmarmorata

Binomial name
- Mesosa postmarmorata Breuning, 1965

= Mesosa postmarmorata =

Species of beetle

Mesosa postmarmorata is a species of beetle in the family Cerambycidae. It was described by Stephan von Breuning in 1965. It is known from Laos.
