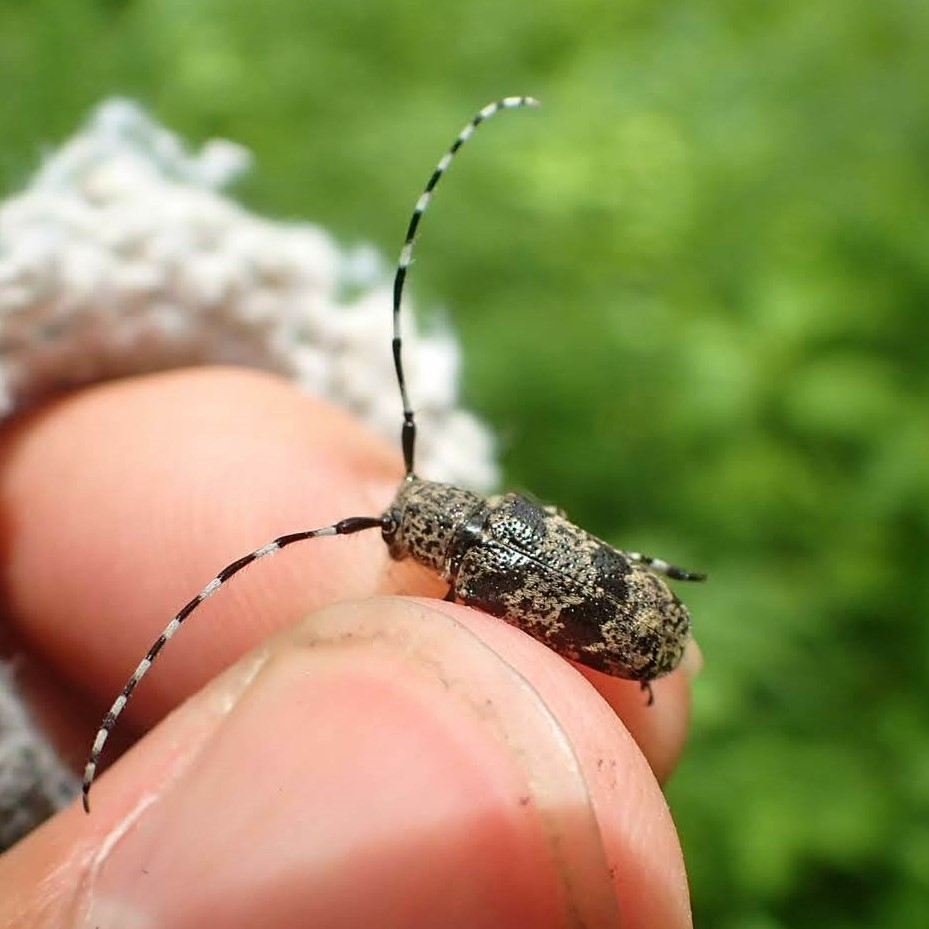

Scientific classification
- Kingdom: Animalia
- Phylum: Arthropoda
- Class: Insecta
- Order: Coleoptera
- Suborder: Polyphaga
- Infraorder: Cucujiformia
- Family: Cerambycidae
- Genus: Mesosa
- Species: M. cribrata

Binomial name
- Mesosa cribrata Bates, 1884

Synonyms
- Mesosa cribrata cribrata (Bates) Hayashi, 1969

= Mesosa cribrata =

Species of beetle

Mesosa cribrata is a species of beetle in the family Cerambycidae. It was first described by Henry Walter Bates in 1884. It is known from Japan.
