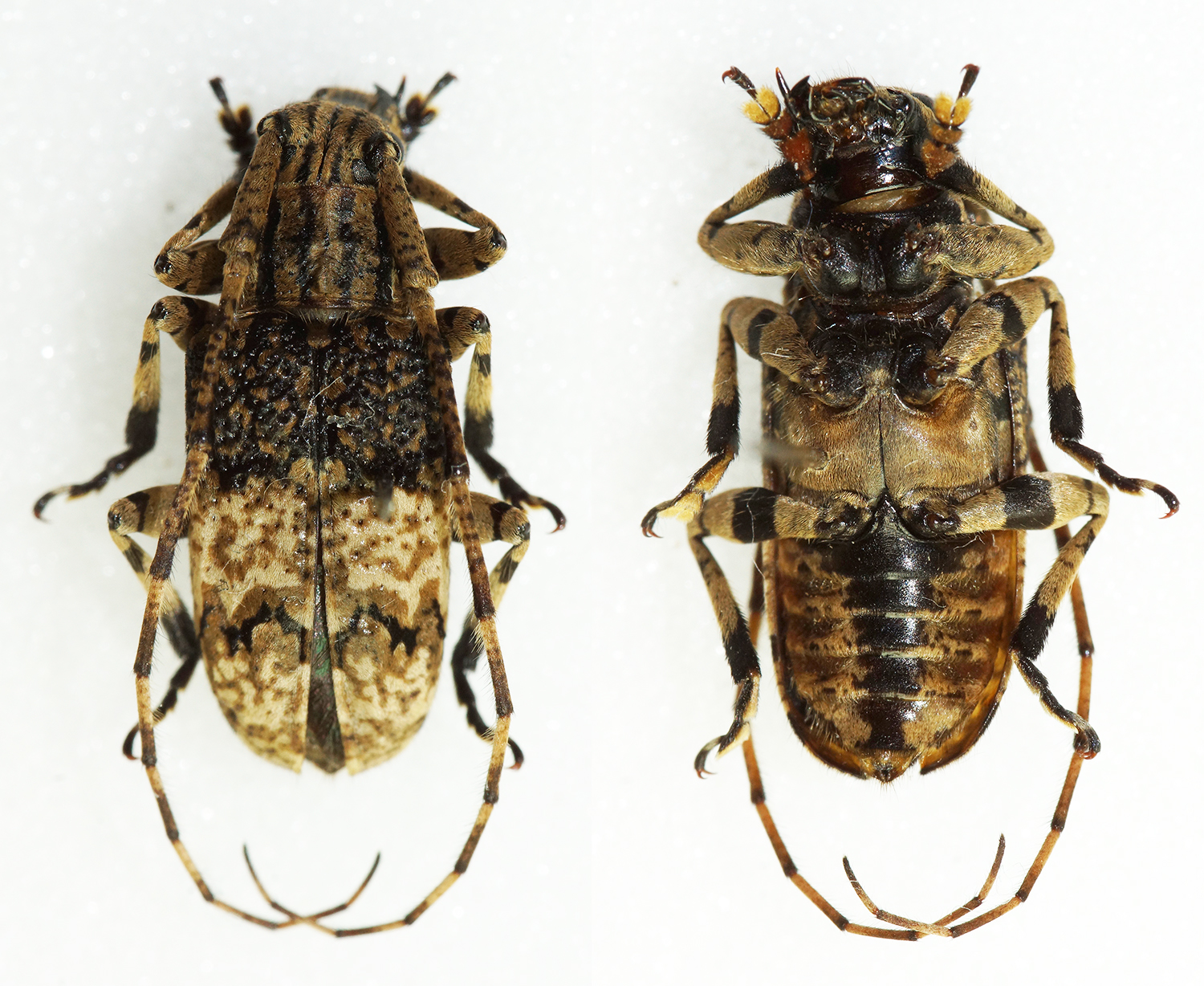

Scientific classification
- Kingdom: Animalia
- Phylum: Arthropoda
- Class: Insecta
- Order: Coleoptera
- Suborder: Polyphaga
- Infraorder: Cucujiformia
- Family: Cerambycidae
- Genus: Mesosa
- Species: M. irrorata

Binomial name
- Mesosa irrorata Gressitt, 1939

= Mesosa irrorata =

Species of beetle

Mesosa irrorata is a species of beetle in the family Cerambycidae. It was described by Gressitt in 1939. It is known from China.
