= Mesosa pieli =

Scientific classification
- Kingdom: Animalia
- Phylum: Arthropoda
- Class: Insecta
- Order: Coleoptera
- Suborder: Polyphaga
- Infraorder: Cucujiformia
- Family: Cerambycidae
- Genus: Mesosa
- Species: M. pieli

Binomial name
- Mesosa pieli Pic, 1936

Species of beetle

Mesosa pieli is a species of beetle in the family Cerambycidae. It was described by Maurice Pic in 1936. It is known from China.
