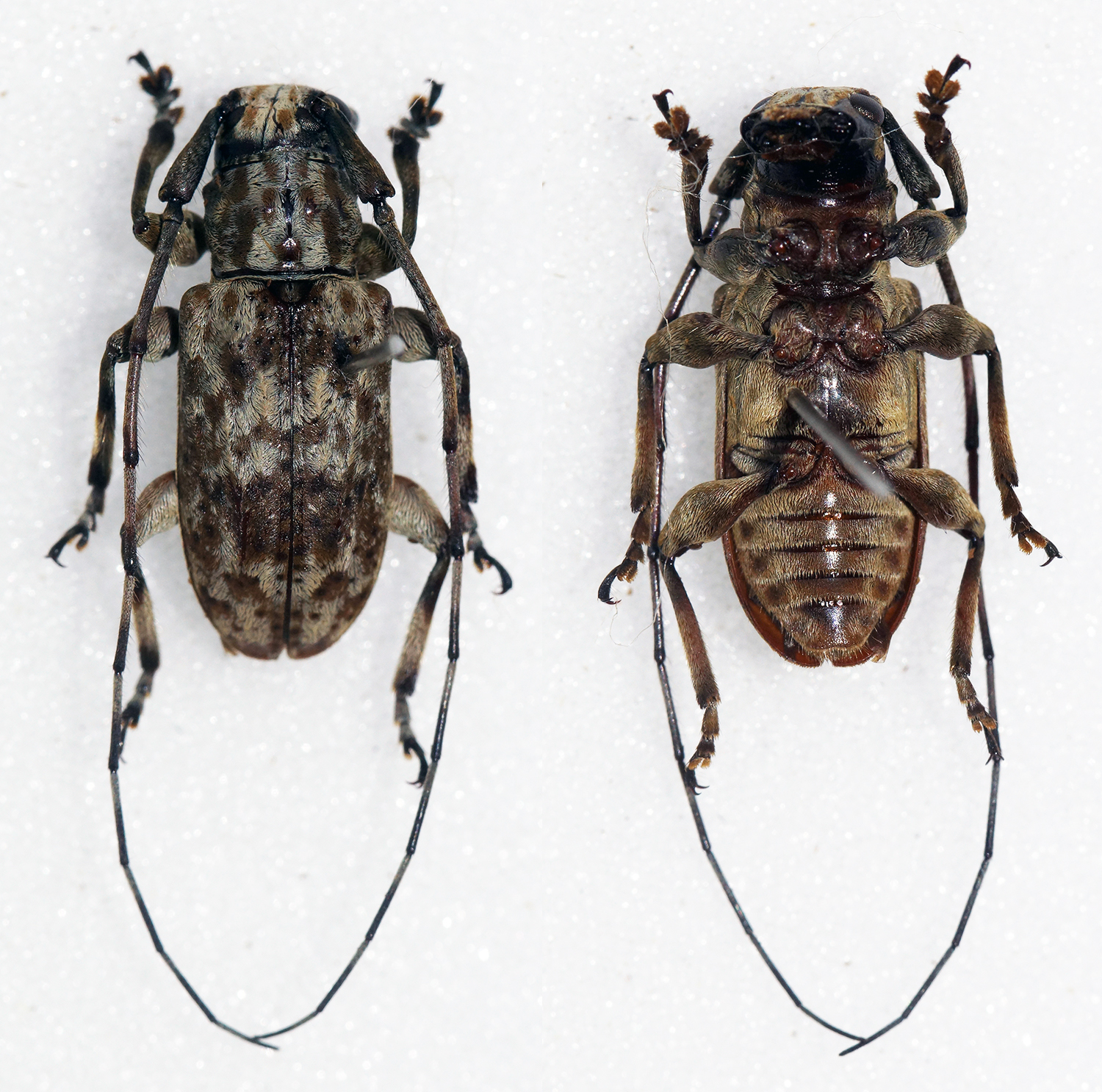

Scientific classification
- Kingdom: Animalia
- Phylum: Arthropoda
- Class: Insecta
- Order: Coleoptera
- Suborder: Polyphaga
- Infraorder: Cucujiformia
- Family: Cerambycidae
- Genus: Mesosa
- Species: M. revoluta

Binomial name
- Mesosa revoluta (Pascoe, 1865)

Synonyms
- Saimia revoluta Pascoe, 1865

= Mesosa revoluta =

Species of beetle

Mesosa revoluta is a species of beetle in the family Cerambycidae. It was described by Francis Polkinghorne Pascoe in 1865. It is known from Borneo.
