= Mesosa quadriplagiata =

Scientific classification
- Kingdom: Animalia
- Phylum: Arthropoda
- Class: Insecta
- Order: Coleoptera
- Suborder: Polyphaga
- Infraorder: Cucujiformia
- Family: Cerambycidae
- Genus: Mesosa
- Species: M. quadriplagiata

Binomial name
- Mesosa quadriplagiata (Breuning, 1935)

Synonyms
- Mesosa dayremi Pic, 1937; Saimia quadriplagiata Breuning, 1935

Species of beetle

Mesosa quadriplagiata is a species of beetle in the family Cerambycidae. It was described by Stephan von Breuning in 1935. It is known from Laos, Vietnam and China.
