= Mesosa yayeyamai =

Scientific classification
- Kingdom: Animalia
- Phylum: Arthropoda
- Class: Insecta
- Order: Coleoptera
- Suborder: Polyphaga
- Infraorder: Cucujiformia
- Family: Cerambycidae
- Genus: Mesosa
- Species: M. yayeyamai

Binomial name
- Mesosa yayeyamai Breuning, 1955

Synonyms
- Mesosa pictipes yayeyamai (Breuning) Hayashi, 1969

Species of beetle

Mesosa yayeyamai is a species of beetle in the family Cerambycidae. It was described by Stephan von Breuning in 1955. It is known from Japan.
