= Mesosa tonkinea =

Scientific classification
- Kingdom: Animalia
- Phylum: Arthropoda
- Class: Insecta
- Order: Coleoptera
- Suborder: Polyphaga
- Infraorder: Cucujiformia
- Family: Cerambycidae
- Genus: Mesosa
- Species: M. tonkinea

Binomial name
- Mesosa tonkinea Breuning, 1939

Synonyms
- Mesosa tonkinensis Breuning, 1936 nec 1935

Species of beetle

Mesosa tonkinea is a species of beetle in the family Cerambycidae. It was described by Stephan von Breuning in 1939. It is known from Vietnam and Laos.
