= Mesosa sparsenotata =

Scientific classification
- Kingdom: Animalia
- Phylum: Arthropoda
- Class: Insecta
- Order: Coleoptera
- Suborder: Polyphaga
- Infraorder: Cucujiformia
- Family: Cerambycidae
- Genus: Mesosa
- Species: M. sparsenotata

Binomial name
- Mesosa sparsenotata Pic, 1922

Species of beetle

Mesosa sparsenotata is a species of beetle in the family Cerambycidae. It was described by Maurice Pic in 1922. It is known from Vietnam.
