= Mesosa subfasciata =

Scientific classification
- Kingdom: Animalia
- Phylum: Arthropoda
- Class: Insecta
- Order: Coleoptera
- Suborder: Polyphaga
- Infraorder: Cucujiformia
- Family: Cerambycidae
- Genus: Mesosa
- Species: M. subfasciata

Binomial name
- Mesosa subfasciata Gahan, 1895

Species of beetle

Mesosa subfasciata is a species of beetle in the family Cerambycidae. It was described by Charles Joseph Gahan in 1895. It is known from Myanmar and India.
