= Mesosa kirishimana =

Scientific classification
- Kingdom: Animalia
- Phylum: Arthropoda
- Class: Insecta
- Order: Coleoptera
- Suborder: Polyphaga
- Infraorder: Cucujiformia
- Family: Cerambycidae
- Genus: Mesosa
- Species: M. kirishimana

Binomial name
- Mesosa kirishimana Matsushita, 1943

Synonyms
- Mesosa cribrata kirishimana (Matsushita) Hayashi, 1969

Species of beetle

Mesosa kirishimana is a species of beetle in the family Cerambycidae. It was described by Masaki Matsushita in 1943. It is known from Japan.
