= Mesosa tricolor =

Scientific classification
- Kingdom: Animalia
- Phylum: Arthropoda
- Class: Insecta
- Order: Coleoptera
- Suborder: Polyphaga
- Infraorder: Cucujiformia
- Family: Cerambycidae
- Genus: Mesosa
- Species: M. tricolor

Binomial name
- Mesosa tricolor Breuning, 1955

Synonyms
- Mesosa (Aphelocnemia) tricolor Breuning, 1955

Species of beetle

Mesosa tricolor is a species of beetle in the family Cerambycidae. It was described by Stephan von Breuning in 1955. It is known from Vietnam.
