= Mesosa vagemarmorata =

Scientific classification
- Kingdom: Animalia
- Phylum: Arthropoda
- Class: Insecta
- Order: Coleoptera
- Suborder: Polyphaga
- Infraorder: Cucujiformia
- Family: Cerambycidae
- Genus: Mesosa
- Species: M. vagemarmorata

Binomial name
- Mesosa vagemarmorata Breuning, 1961

Species of beetle

Mesosa vagemarmorata is a species of beetle in the family Cerambycidae. It was described by Stephan von Breuning in 1961. It is known from Vietnam.
