= Mesosa kanarensis =

Scientific classification
- Kingdom: Animalia
- Phylum: Arthropoda
- Class: Insecta
- Order: Coleoptera
- Suborder: Polyphaga
- Infraorder: Cucujiformia
- Family: Cerambycidae
- Genus: Mesosa
- Species: M. kanarensis

Binomial name
- Mesosa kanarensis Breuning, 1948

Species of beetles

Mesosa kanarensis is a species of beetles in the family Cerambycidae. It was described by Stephan von Breuning in 1948. It is known from India.
