= Eutaenia corbetti =

Scientific classification
- Kingdom: Animalia
- Phylum: Arthropoda
- Class: Insecta
- Order: Coleoptera
- Suborder: Polyphaga
- Infraorder: Cucujiformia
- Family: Cerambycidae
- Genus: Eutaenia
- Species: E. corbetti

Binomial name
- Eutaenia corbetti Gahan, 1893

Species of beetle

Eutaenia corbetti is a species of beetle in the family Cerambycidae. It was described by Charles Joseph Gahan in 1893. It is known from Laos, Thailand, India and Myanmar.
