= Mesosa marmorata =

Scientific classification
- Kingdom: Animalia
- Phylum: Arthropoda
- Class: Insecta
- Order: Coleoptera
- Suborder: Polyphaga
- Infraorder: Cucujiformia
- Family: Cerambycidae
- Genus: Mesosa
- Species: M. marmorata

Binomial name
- Mesosa marmorata Breuning & Itzinger, 1943

Species of beetle

Mesosa marmorata is a species of beetle in the family Cerambycidae. It was described by Stephan von Breuning and Itzinger in 1943. It is known from Myanmar and Laos.
