= Mesosa subtenuefasciata =

Scientific classification
- Kingdom: Animalia
- Phylum: Arthropoda
- Class: Insecta
- Order: Coleoptera
- Suborder: Polyphaga
- Infraorder: Cucujiformia
- Family: Cerambycidae
- Genus: Mesosa
- Species: M. subtenuefasciata

Binomial name
- Mesosa subtenuefasciata Breuning, 1968

Species of beetle

Mesosa subtenuefasciata is a species of beetle in the family Cerambycidae. It was described by Stephan von Breuning in 1968. It is known from Laos.
