= Mesosa expansa =

Scientific classification
- Kingdom: Animalia
- Phylum: Arthropoda
- Class: Insecta
- Order: Coleoptera
- Suborder: Polyphaga
- Infraorder: Cucujiformia
- Family: Cerambycidae
- Genus: Mesosa
- Species: M. expansa

Binomial name
- Mesosa expansa (Hong, 1983) †

Synonyms
- Sinocalosoma expansum (Hong, 1983); Sinocaralosoma expansum Hong, 1983

Species of beetle

Mesosa expansa is an extinct species of beetle in the family Cerambycidae, that existed during the Lower to Middle Miocene. It was described by Hong in 1983.
