= Eutaenia formosana =

Scientific classification
- Kingdom: Animalia
- Phylum: Arthropoda
- Class: Insecta
- Order: Coleoptera
- Suborder: Polyphaga
- Infraorder: Cucujiformia
- Family: Cerambycidae
- Genus: Eutaenia
- Species: E. formosana

Binomial name
- Eutaenia formosana Matsushita, 1941

Species of beetle

Eutaenia formosana is a species of beetle in the family Cerambycidae. It was described by Masaki Matsushita in 1941. It is known from Taiwan.
