= Mesosa niasica =

Scientific classification
- Kingdom: Animalia
- Phylum: Arthropoda
- Clade: Pancrustacea
- Class: Insecta
- Order: Coleoptera
- Suborder: Polyphaga
- Infraorder: Cucujiformia
- Family: Cerambycidae
- Genus: Mesosa
- Species: M. niasica

Binomial name
- Mesosa niasica (Breuning, 1935)

Synonyms
- Saimia niasica Breuning, 1935

Species of beetle

Mesosa niasica is a species of beetle in the family Cerambycidae. It was described by Stephan von Breuning in 1935. It is known from Sumatra and Java.
