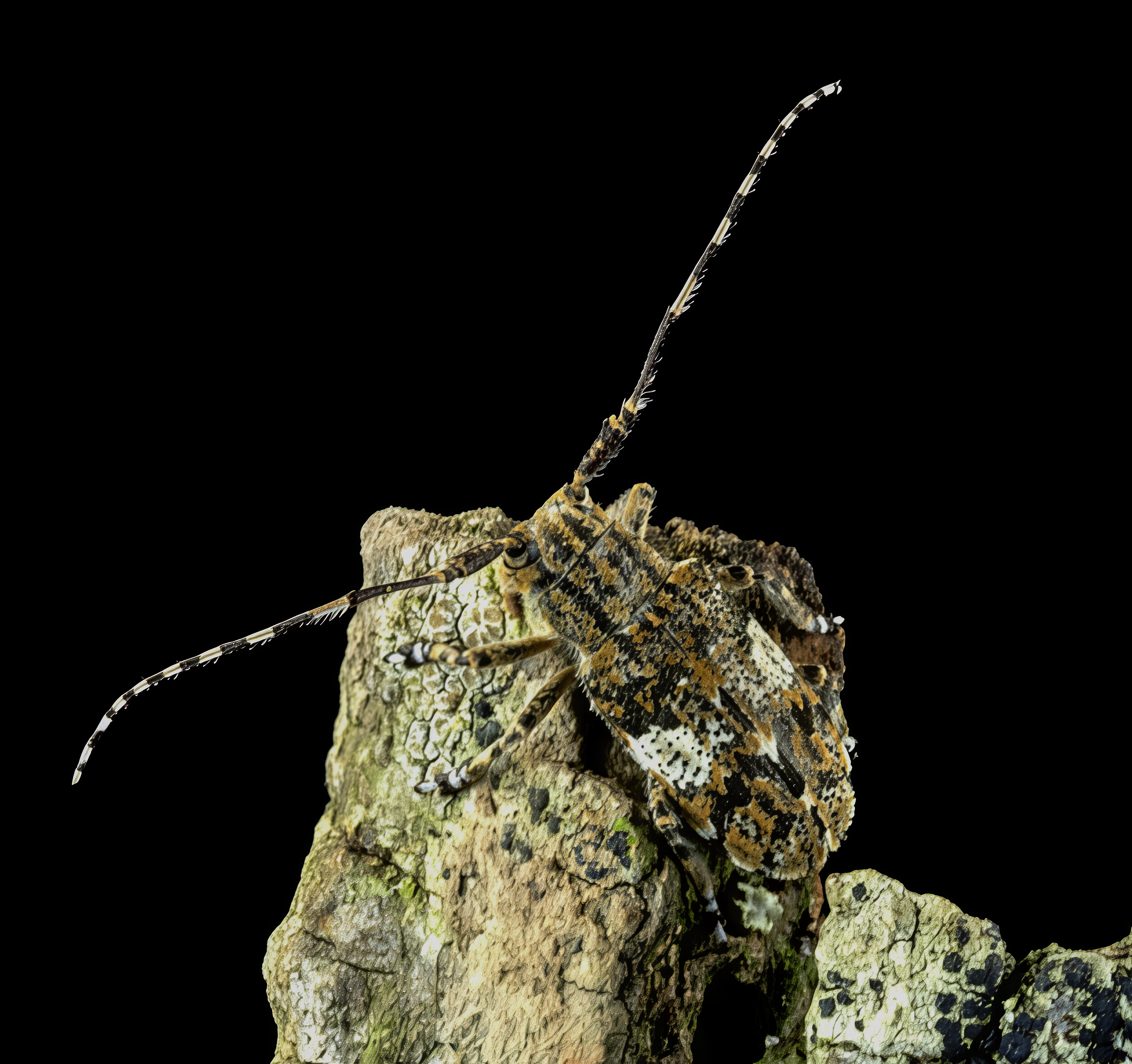

Scientific classification
- Kingdom: Animalia
- Phylum: Arthropoda
- Clade: Pancrustacea
- Class: Insecta
- Order: Coleoptera
- Suborder: Polyphaga
- Infraorder: Cucujiformia
- Family: Cerambycidae
- Genus: Mesosa
- Species: M. nebulosa

Binomial name
- Mesosa nebulosa (Fabricius, 1781)

Synonyms
- Aphelocnemia nebulosa (Fabricius, 1781); Cerambyx brevis Villers, 1789 nec Sulzer, 1776; Cerambyx nebulator Turton, 1806; Cerambyx nubilus Gmelin, 1790; Haplocnemia nebulosa (Fabricius, 1781); Lamia nebulosa Fabricius, 1781; Lamia nubila (Schönherr); Mesosa nubila (Gmelin, 1790)

= Mesosa nebulosa =

Species of beetle

Mesosa nebulosa is a species of beetle in the family Cerambycidae. It was described by Johan Christian Fabricius in 1781, originally under the genus Lamia. It has a wide distribution throughout Europe and the Caucasus. It measures between 9 and 15 mm (0.35 and 0.59 in).

M. nebulosa feeds on Corylus avellana, Ficus carica, and Juglans regia.

== Subspecies ==
- Mesosa nebulosa algerica Pic, 1898
- Mesosa nebulosa nebulosa (Fabricius, 1781)
