= Eutaenia albomaculata =

Scientific classification
- Kingdom: Animalia
- Phylum: Arthropoda
- Class: Insecta
- Order: Coleoptera
- Suborder: Polyphaga
- Infraorder: Cucujiformia
- Family: Cerambycidae
- Genus: Eutaenia
- Species: E. albomaculata

Binomial name
- Eutaenia albomaculata Breuning, 1935

Species of beetle

Eutaenia albomaculata is a species of beetle in the family Cerambycidae. It was described by Stephan von Breuning in 1935.
