= Mesosa sophiae =

Scientific classification
- Kingdom: Animalia
- Phylum: Arthropoda
- Class: Insecta
- Order: Coleoptera
- Suborder: Polyphaga
- Infraorder: Cucujiformia
- Family: Cerambycidae
- Genus: Mesosa
- Species: M. sophiae

Binomial name
- Mesosa sophiae (Statz, 1938) †

Synonyms
- Haplocnemia sophiae Statz, 1938

Species of beetle

Mesosa sophiae is an extinct species of beetle in the family Cerambycidae, that existed during the Upper Oligocene. It was described by Statz in 1938, originally under the genus Haplocnemia. It is known from Germany.
