= Mesosa anancyloides =

Scientific classification
- Kingdom: Animalia
- Phylum: Arthropoda
- Class: Insecta
- Order: Coleoptera
- Suborder: Polyphaga
- Infraorder: Cucujiformia
- Family: Cerambycidae
- Genus: Mesosa
- Species: M. anancyloides

Binomial name
- Mesosa anancyloides Villiers & Chujo, 1962

Species of beetle

Mesosa anancyloides is a species of beetle in the family Cerambycidae. It was described by Villiers and Chujo in 1962. It is known from Thailand.
