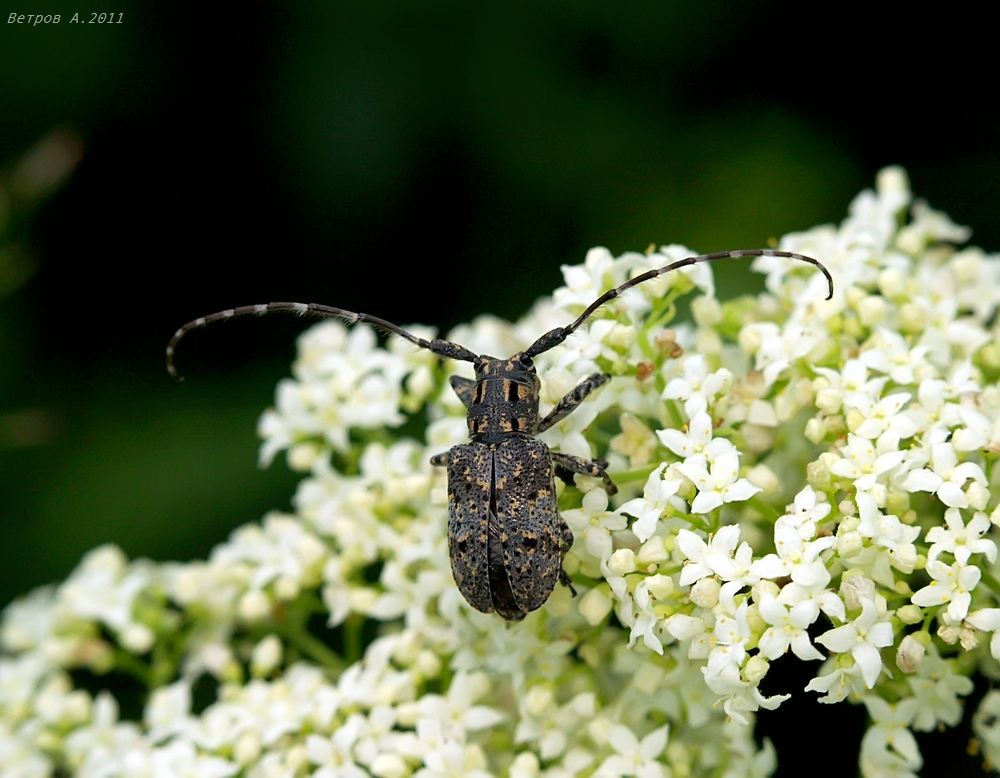

Scientific classification
- Kingdom: Animalia
- Phylum: Arthropoda
- Class: Insecta
- Order: Coleoptera
- Suborder: Polyphaga
- Infraorder: Cucujiformia
- Family: Cerambycidae
- Genus: Mesosa
- Species: M. myops

Binomial name
- Mesosa myops (Dalman, 1817)

Synonyms
- Cerambyx myops Dalman, 1817

= Mesosa myops =

Species of beetle

Mesosa myops is a species of beetle in the family Cerambycidae. It was described by Dalman in 1817, originally under the genus Cerambyx. It is known from Russia, China, Finland, Japan, Kazakhstan, Lithuania, Latvia, Belarus, Mongolia, North Korea, South Korea, Poland, Taiwan, and Ukraine.

== Subspecies ==
- Mesosa myops japonica Bates, 1873
- Mesosa myops myops (Dalman, 1817)
- Mesosa myops plotina Wang, 2003
