= Mesosa blairi =

Scientific classification
- Kingdom: Animalia
- Phylum: Arthropoda
- Clade: Pancrustacea
- Class: Insecta
- Order: Coleoptera
- Suborder: Polyphaga
- Infraorder: Cucujiformia
- Family: Cerambycidae
- Genus: Mesosa
- Species: M. blairi

Binomial name
- Mesosa blairi Breuning, 1935

Synonyms
- Saimia blairi Breuning, 1935

Species of beetle

Mesosa blairi is a species of beetle in the family Cerambycidae. It was described by Stephan von Breuning in 1935. It is known from Java and Malaysia.
