= Lamia petrificata =

Scientific classification
- Kingdom: Animalia
- Phylum: Arthropoda
- Clade: Pancrustacea
- Class: Insecta
- Order: Coleoptera
- Suborder: Polyphaga
- Infraorder: Cucujiformia
- Family: Cerambycidae
- Genus: Lamia
- Species: †L. petrificata

Binomial name
- †Lamia petrificata Heyden & Heyden, 1856

Species of beetle

Lamia petrificata is an extinct species of beetle in the family Cerambycidae, that existed during the Upper Oligocene. It was described by Heyden and Heyden in 1856. It is known from Germany.
