= Mesosa incongrua =

Scientific classification
- Kingdom: Animalia
- Phylum: Arthropoda
- Class: Insecta
- Order: Coleoptera
- Suborder: Polyphaga
- Infraorder: Cucujiformia
- Family: Cerambycidae
- Genus: Mesosa
- Species: M. incongrua

Binomial name
- Mesosa incongrua Pascoe, 1885

Species of beetle

Mesosa incongrua is a species of beetle in the family Cerambycidae. It was described by Francis Polkinghorne Pascoe in 1885. It is known from Borneo.
