= Mesosa obscura =

Scientific classification
- Kingdom: Animalia
- Phylum: Arthropoda
- Class: Insecta
- Order: Coleoptera
- Suborder: Polyphaga
- Infraorder: Cucujiformia
- Family: Cerambycidae
- Genus: Mesosa
- Species: M. obscura

Binomial name
- Mesosa obscura Gahan, 1895

Species of beetle

Mesosa obscura is a species of beetle in the family Cerambycidae. It was described by Charles Joseph Gahan in 1895. It is known from Myanmar, and possibly also China.
