= Mesosa maculifemorata =

Scientific classification
- Kingdom: Animalia
- Phylum: Arthropoda
- Class: Insecta
- Order: Coleoptera
- Suborder: Polyphaga
- Infraorder: Cucujiformia
- Family: Cerambycidae
- Genus: Mesosa
- Species: M. maculifemorata

Binomial name
- Mesosa maculifemorata Gressitt, 1940

Species of beetle

Mesosa maculifemorata is a species of beetle in the family Cerambycidae. It was described by Gressitt in 1940. It is known from Vietnam and China.
