= Mesosa soteria =

Scientific classification
- Kingdom: Animalia
- Phylum: Arthropoda
- Class: Insecta
- Order: Coleoptera
- Suborder: Polyphaga
- Infraorder: Cucujiformia
- Family: Cerambycidae
- Genus: Mesosa
- Species: M. soteria

Binomial name
- Mesosa soteria Zhang, 1989 †

Species of beetle

Mesosa soteria is an extinct species of beetle in the family Cerambycidae, that existed during the Lower to Middle Miocene. It was described by Zhang in 1989.
