= Mesosa yunnana =

Scientific classification
- Kingdom: Animalia
- Phylum: Arthropoda
- Class: Insecta
- Order: Coleoptera
- Suborder: Polyphaga
- Infraorder: Cucujiformia
- Family: Cerambycidae
- Genus: Mesosa
- Species: M. yunnana

Binomial name
- Mesosa yunnana (Breuning, 1938)

Synonyms
- Saimia yunnana Breuning, 1938

Species of beetle

Mesosa yunnana is a species of beetle in the family Cerambycidae. It was described by Stephan von Breuning in 1938. It is known from China.
