= Mesosa poecila =

Scientific classification
- Kingdom: Animalia
- Phylum: Arthropoda
- Class: Insecta
- Order: Coleoptera
- Suborder: Polyphaga
- Infraorder: Cucujiformia
- Family: Cerambycidae
- Genus: Mesosa
- Species: M. poecila

Binomial name
- Mesosa poecila Bates, 1884

Species of beetle

Mesosa poecila is a species of beetle in the family Cerambycidae. It was described by Henry Walter Bates in 1884. It is known from Japan.
