= Mesosa indica =

Scientific classification
- Kingdom: Animalia
- Phylum: Arthropoda
- Class: Insecta
- Order: Coleoptera
- Suborder: Polyphaga
- Infraorder: Cucujiformia
- Family: Cerambycidae
- Genus: Mesosa
- Species: M. indica

Binomial name
- Mesosa indica (Breuning, 1935)

Synonyms
- Saimia indica Breuning, 1935

Species of beetle

Mesosa indica is a species of beetle in the family Cerambycidae. It was described by Stephan von Breuning in 1935. It is known from Sri Lanka, India, Vietnam, and Myanmar.
