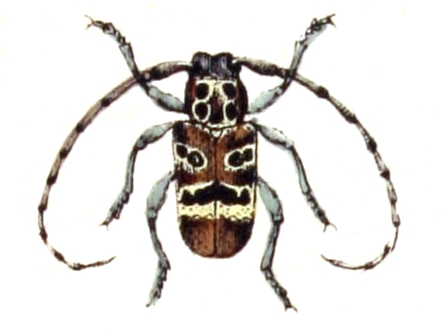
- Mesosa curculionoides

Scientific classification
- Kingdom: Animalia
- Phylum: Arthropoda
- Class: Insecta
- Order: Coleoptera
- Suborder: Polyphaga
- Infraorder: Cucujiformia
- Family: Cerambycidae
- Tribe: Mesosini
- Genus: Mesosa; LeConte, 1852

= Mesosa =

Genus of beetles

Mesosa is a genus of longhorn beetles of the subfamily Lamiinae, containing the following species:

subgenus Aplocnemia

- Mesosa affinis Breuning, 1936
- Mesosa anancyloides Villiers & Chujo, 1962
- Mesosa andrewsi Gressitt, 1942
- Mesosa angusta Gressitt, 1951
- Mesosa bialbomaculata Breuning, 1968
- Mesosa bifasciata Breuning, 1938
- Mesosa cheni Gressitt, 1951
- Mesosa griseomarmorata Breuning, 1939
- Mesosa kanarensis Breuning, 1948
- Mesosa latifasciata (White, 1858)
- Mesosa longipennis Bates, 1873
- Mesosa mouhoti Breuning, 1970
- Mesosa nebulosa (Fabricius, 1781)
- Mesosa nigrofasciaticollis Breuning, 1968
- Mesosa ornata (Gahan, 1895)
- Mesosa persimilis Breuning, 1936
- Mesosa rosa Karsch, 1882
- Mesosa rupta (Pascoe, 1862)
- Mesosa senilis Bates, 1884
- Mesosa sikkimensis Breuning, 1935
- Mesosa sophiae (Statz, 1938) †
- Mesosa sparsenotata Pic, 1922
- Mesosa subbifasciata Breuning, 1974
- Mesosa subfasciata Gahan, 1895
- Mesosa subrupta Breuning, 1968
- Mesosa subtenuefasciata Breuning, 1968
- Mesosa tenuefasciata Pic, 1926
- Mesosa tonkinea Breuning, 1939
- Mesosa tricolor Breuning, 1955
- Mesosa undata (Fabricius, 1792)

subgenus Mesosa

- Mesosa curculionoides (Linnaeus, 1761)
- Mesosa harmandi Breuning, 1970
- Mesosa mediofasciata Breuning, 1942
- Mesosa myops (Dalman, 1817)
- Mesosa stictica Blanchard, 1871

subgenus Metamesosa

- Mesosa basinodosa Pic, 1925
- Mesosa inaequalipennis Pic, 1944
- Mesosa nomurai Hayashi, 1964
- Mesosa sinica (Gressitt, 1939)

subgenus Perimesosa

- Mesosa atrostigma Gressitt, 1942
- Mesosa bimaculata Breuning, 1936
- Mesosa binigrovittata Breuning, 1942
- Mesosa binigrovittipennis Breuning, 1968
- Mesosa chassoti Breuning, 1970
- Mesosa cribrata Bates, 1884
- Mesosa hirsuta Bates, 1884
- Mesosa irrorata Gressitt, 1939
- Mesosa kirishimana Matsushita, 1943
- Mesosa maculifemorata Gressitt, 1940
- Mesosa medana Breuning, 1954
- Mesosa medioalbofaciata Breuning, 1969
- Mesosa obscuricornis Pic, 1894
- Mesosa pictipes Gressitt, 1937
- Mesosa pieli Pic, 1936
- Mesosa poecila Bates, 1884
- Mesosa seminivea Breuning, 1965
- Mesosa setulosa Breuning, 1938
- Mesosa undulatofasciata Breuning, 1955
- Mesosa yayeyamai Breuning, 1955

subgenus Saimia

- Mesosa albidorsalis (Pascoe, 1865)
- Mesosa albofasciata (Breuning, 1935)
- Mesosa albomarmorata Breuning, 1939
- Mesosa alternata (Breuning, 1936)
- Mesosa amakusae Breuning, 1964
- Mesosa biplagiata (Breuning, 1935)
- Mesosa blairi Breuning, 1935
- Mesosa fruhstorferi Breuning, 1968
- Mesosa griseiventris (Breuning, 1938)
- Mesosa hirticornis (Gressitt, 1936)
- Mesosa incongrua Pascoe, 1885
- Mesosa indica (Breuning, 1935)
- Mesosa innodosa Pic, 1925
- Mesosa kaloensis Breuning, 1938
- Mesosa kuntzeni Matsushita, 1933
- Mesosa lata Breuning, 1956
- Mesosa latefasciatipennis Breuning, 1968
- Mesosa laterialba (Breuning, 1936)
- Mesosa lineata Breuning, 1939
- Mesosa marmorata Breuning & Itzinger, 1943
- Mesosa multinigrosignata Breuning, 1974
- Mesosa niasica (Breuning, 1935)
- Mesosa nigrosignata Breuning, 1939
- Mesosa obscura Gahan, 1895
- Mesosa pardina Heller, 1926
- Mesosa plurinigrosignata Breuning, 1982
- Mesosa pontianakensis Breuning, 1967
- Mesosa postfasciata Breuning, 1974
- Mesosa postmarmorata Breuning, 1965
- Mesosa quadriplagiata (Breuning, 1935)
- Mesosa revoluta (Pascoe, 1865)
- Mesosa rondoni Breuning, 1962
- Mesosa siamensis (Breuning, 1938)
- Mesosa sumatrana (Breuning, 1936)
- Mesosa tonkinensis (Breuning, 1935)
- Mesosa vagemarmorata Breuning, 1961
- Mesosa yunnana (Breuning, 1938)

incertae sedis

- Mesosa expansa (Hong, 1983) †
- Mesosa laxa Zhang, 1989 †
- Mesosa soteria Zhang, 1989 †
- Mesosa varia Zhang, 1989 †
