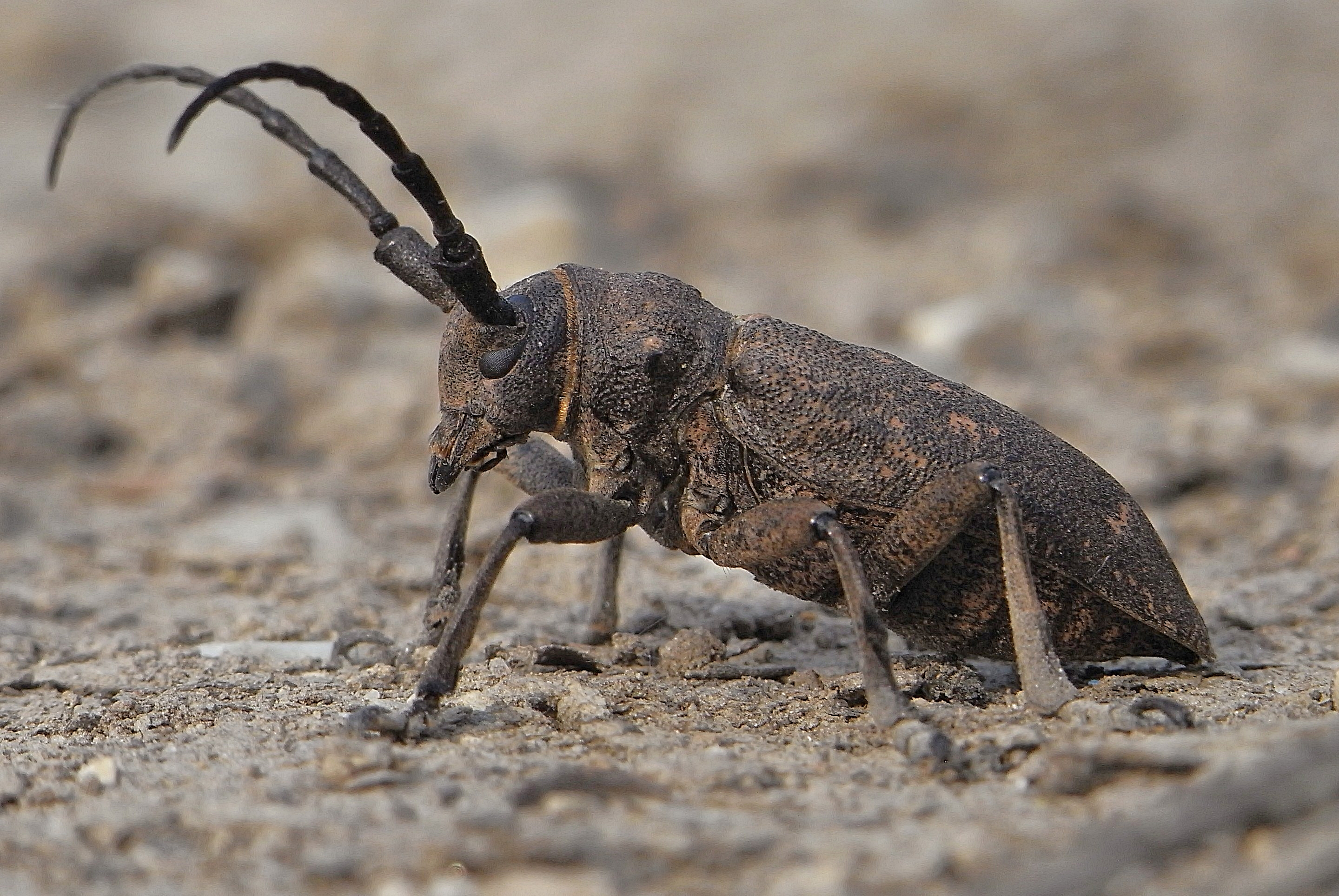

Scientific classification
- Kingdom: Animalia
- Phylum: Arthropoda
- Class: Insecta
- Order: Coleoptera
- Suborder: Polyphaga
- Infraorder: Cucujiformia
- Family: Cerambycidae
- Subfamily: Lamiinae
- Tribe: Lamiini
- Genus: Lamia
- Species: L. textor

Binomial name
- Lamia textor (Linnaeus, 1758)

Synonyms
- Cerambyx cephaloses Voet, 1778; Cerambyx nigrorugosus Degeer, 1775; Cerambyx noctis Gronovius, 1764; Cerambyx textor Poda, 1761; Cerambyx unicolor Brown, 1776; Lamia gennadii Buquet, 1882; Lamia jezoensis Doi, 1924; Lamia tricarinata Cornelius, 1884; Pachystola textor Dejean, 1835

= Weaver beetle =

Species of beetle

The weaver beetle (Lamia textor) is a species of beetle from subfamily Lamiinae in long-horned beetle family; it is a European and North Asian species. Larvae develop in willow trees, rare in birch and poplar.

Distributed everywhere in Western Europe, except extreme north, also distributed in Central and Eastern Europe, Siberia (meets on territories where appropriate these species food plants, starting from southern part of tundra), Caucasus, South Caucasus (rare), Sakhalin, in northern and western parts of Kazakhstan, Japan, Korea and in northeast of China.

Imago is 15–32 mm long. Egg is 4.5–5 mm in length, and 1.2–1.4 mm in diameter.

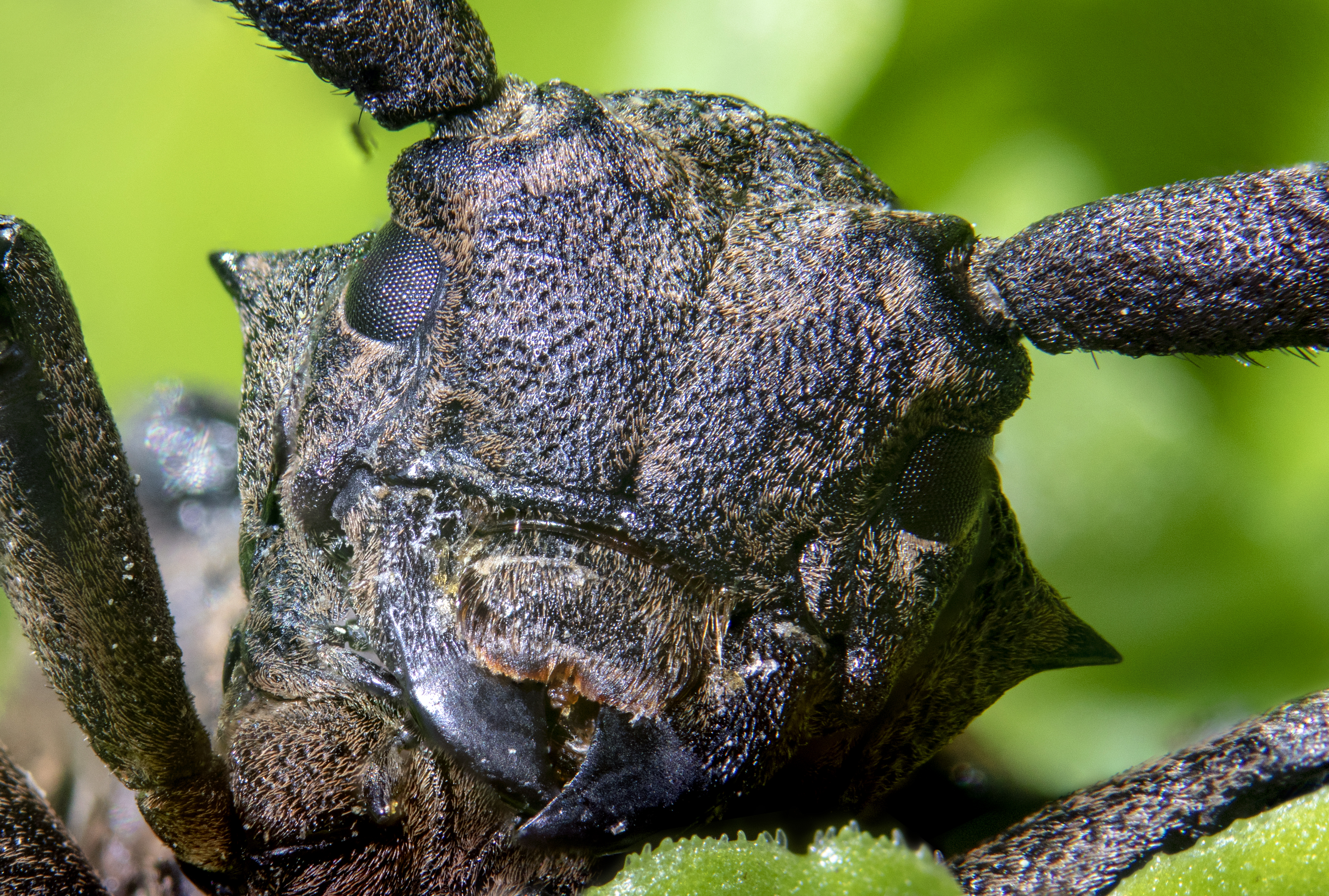
Front view of a weaver beetle's head with high magnification
