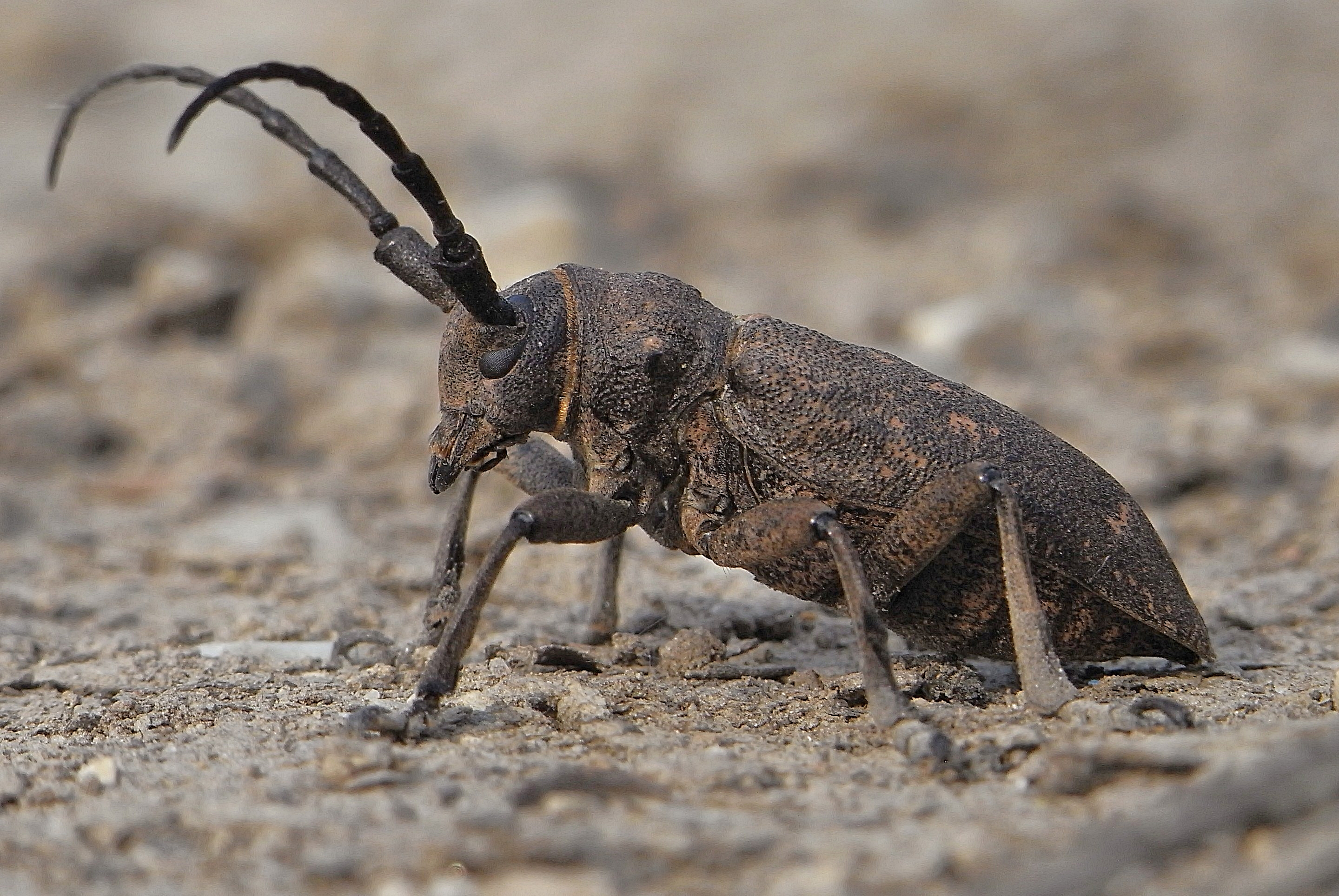
- Lamia textor

Scientific classification
- Kingdom: Animalia
- Phylum: Arthropoda
- Class: Insecta
- Order: Coleoptera
- Suborder: Polyphaga
- Infraorder: Cucujiformia
- Family: Cerambycidae
- Subfamily: Lamiinae
- Tribe: Lamiini
- Genus: Lamia; Fabricius, 1775

Synonyms
- Morimidus Thomson, 1859

= Lamia (beetle) =

Genus of beetle

Lamia is a genus of beetles typical of the subfamily Lamiinae in long-horned beetle family; species are recorded from Europe and North Asia and include the Weaver beetle.

== Species ==
The Global Biodiversity Information Facility includes the following species names:

- Lamia annulicornis Kirby, 1818 from Brazil: nomen dubium
- Lamia antiqua Heer, 1879: nomen dubium
- †Lamia petrificata von Heyden & von Heyden, 1866
- Lamia textor (Linnaeus, 1758) - western Europe through to temperate Asia
- Lamia vaginator Fabricius, 1787: nomen dubium

Note name changes:

- Lamia nubila Gmelin, 1790 is now placed in genus Mesosa.
- Lamia rugulosa Guérin, 1831 is now placed in Athemistus
