= Annamanum griseolum =

Scientific classification
- Domain: Eukaryota
- Kingdom: Animalia
- Phylum: Arthropoda
- Class: Insecta
- Order: Coleoptera
- Suborder: Polyphaga
- Infraorder: Cucujiformia
- Family: Cerambycidae
- Tribe: Lamiini
- Genus: Annamanum
- Species: A. griseolum

Binomial name
- Annamanum griseolum (Bates, 1884)

Synonyms
- Uraecha griseola Bates, 1884; Annamanum griseatum (Bates, 1844) (misspelling); Uraecha griseata Bates, 1844 (misspelling)

Species of beetle

Annamanum griseolum is a species of beetle in the family Cerambycidae. It was described by Henry Walter Bates in 1884, originally under the genus Uraecha. It is known from Japan.
