= Acalolepta ampliata =

Scientific classification
- Domain: Eukaryota
- Kingdom: Animalia
- Phylum: Arthropoda
- Class: Insecta
- Order: Coleoptera
- Suborder: Polyphaga
- Infraorder: Cucujiformia
- Family: Cerambycidae
- Tribe: Lamiini
- Genus: Acalolepta
- Species: A. ampliata

Binomial name
- Acalolepta ampliata (Gahan, 1888)

Synonyms
- Orsidis ampliatus Gahan, 1888

Species of beetle

Acalolepta ampliata is a species of beetle in the family Cerambycidae. It was described by Charles Joseph Gahan in 1888, originally under the genus Orsidis. It is known from the Solomon Islands, Bougainville, the Admiralty Islands, and Vanuatu. It measures between 17 and 27 mm (0.67 and 1.06 in).
