= Annamanum plagiatum =

Scientific classification
- Kingdom: Animalia
- Phylum: Arthropoda
- Class: Insecta
- Order: Coleoptera
- Suborder: Polyphaga
- Infraorder: Cucujiformia
- Family: Cerambycidae
- Genus: Annamanum
- Species: A. plagiatum

Binomial name
- Annamanum plagiatum (Aurivillius, 1913)

Synonyms
- Orsidis plagiatus Aurivillius, 1913; Orsidis plagiata Aurivillius, 1913 (misspelling)

Species of beetle

Annamanum plagiatum is a species of beetle in the family Cerambycidae. It was described by Per Olof Christopher Aurivillius in 1913, originally under the genus Orsidis. It is known from Borneo and Malaysia.
