= Granulorsidis flavidosignatus =

Scientific classification
- Domain: Eukaryota
- Kingdom: Animalia
- Phylum: Arthropoda
- Class: Insecta
- Order: Coleoptera
- Suborder: Polyphaga
- Infraorder: Cucujiformia
- Family: Cerambycidae
- Genus: Granulorsidis
- Species: G. flavidosignatus

Binomial name
- Granulorsidis flavidosignatus (Aurivillius, 1927)

Synonyms
- Orsidis flavidosignatus Aurivillius, 1927; Dihammus flavidosignatus (Aurivillius, 1927); Granulorsidis granulipennis Breuning, 1980; Acalolepta flavidosignata (Aurivillius, 1927)

Species of beetle

Granulorsidis flavidosignatus is a species of beetle in the family Cerambycidae. It was described by Per Olof Christopher Aurivillius in 1927, originally under the genus Orsidis. It is known from the Philippines.
