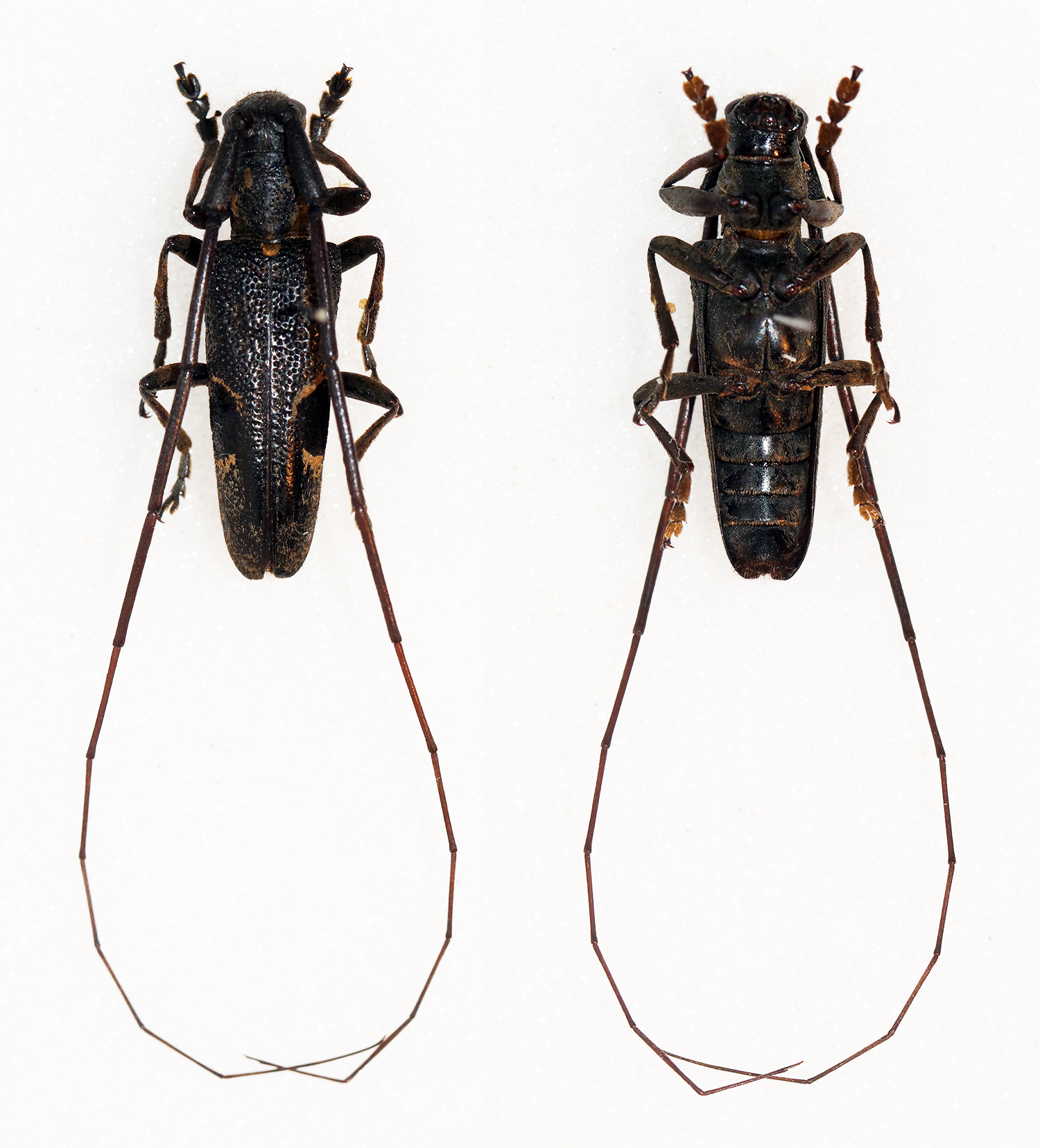
- Annamanum lunulatum

Scientific classification
- Domain: Eukaryota
- Kingdom: Animalia
- Phylum: Arthropoda
- Class: Insecta
- Order: Coleoptera
- Suborder: Polyphaga
- Infraorder: Cucujiformia
- Family: Cerambycidae
- Subfamily: Lamiinae
- Tribe: Lamiini
- Genus: Annamanum; Pic, 1925

Synonyms
- Uraechopsis Breuning, 1935

= Annamanum =

Genus of beetles

Annamanum is a genus of longhorn beetles of the subfamily Lamiinae, containing the following species:

- Annamanum albisparsum (Gahan, 1888)
- Annamanum albomaculatum (Breuning, 1935)
- Annamanum alboplagiatum Breuning, 1966
- Annamanum annamanum Breuning, 1960
- Annamanum annulicorne (Pic, 1934)
- Annamanum basigranulatum Breuning, 1970
- Annamanum cardoni Breuning, 1953
- Annamanum chebanum (Gahan, 1895)
- Annamanum fuscomaculatum Breuning, 1979
- Annamanum griseolum (Bates, 1884)
- Annamanum griseomaculatum Breuning, 1936
- Annamanum guerryi (Pic, 1903)
- Annamanum humerale (Pic, 1934)
- Annamanum indicum Breuning, 1938
- Annamanum irregulare (Pic, 1925)
- Annamanum lunulatum (Pic, 1934)
- Annamanum mediomaculatum Breuning, 1962
- Annamanum ochreopictum Breuning, 1969
- Annamanum plagiatum (Aurivillius, 1913)
- Annamanum rondoni Breuning, 1962
- Annamanum sikkimense Breuning, 1942
- Annamanum sinicum Gressitt, 1951
- Annamanum strandi Breuning, 1938
- Annamanum subauratum Breuning, 1957
- Annamanum subirregulare Breuning, 1950
- Annamanum szetschuanicum Breuning, 1947
- Annamanum thoracicum (Gahan, 1895)
- Annamanum touzalini Breuning, 1979
- Annamanum yunnanum Breuning, 1947
