= Uraecha ochreomarmorata =

Scientific classification
- Kingdom: Animalia
- Phylum: Arthropoda
- Class: Insecta
- Order: Coleoptera
- Suborder: Polyphaga
- Infraorder: Cucujiformia
- Family: Cerambycidae
- Genus: Uraecha
- Species: U. ochreomarmorata

Binomial name
- Uraecha ochreomarmorata Breuning, 1965

Species of beetle

Uraecha ochreomarmorata is a species of beetle in the family Cerambycidae. It was described by Stephan von Breuning in 1965. It is known from Laos.
