= Annamanum touzalini =

Scientific classification
- Kingdom: Animalia
- Phylum: Arthropoda
- Class: Insecta
- Order: Coleoptera
- Suborder: Polyphaga
- Infraorder: Cucujiformia
- Family: Cerambycidae
- Genus: Annamanum
- Species: A. touzalini

Binomial name
- Annamanum touzalini Breuning, 1979

Species of beetle

Annamanum touzalini is a species of beetle in the family Cerambycidae. It was described by Stephan von Breuning in 1979. It is known from Vietnam.
