= Granulorsidis cariosus =

Scientific classification
- Kingdom: Animalia
- Phylum: Arthropoda
- Clade: Pancrustacea
- Class: Insecta
- Order: Coleoptera
- Suborder: Polyphaga
- Infraorder: Cucujiformia
- Family: Cerambycidae
- Genus: Granulorsidis
- Species: G. cariosus

Binomial name
- Granulorsidis cariosus (Pascoe, 1866)

Synonyms
- Orsidis cariosus Pascoe, 1866; Acalolepta cariosa (Pascoe, 1866)

Species of beetle

Granulorsidis cariosus is a species of beetle in the family Cerambycidae. It was described by Francis Polkinghorne Pascoe in 1866. It is known from Singapore, Indonesian Sumatra, plus Borneo including Malaysia (Sabah).
