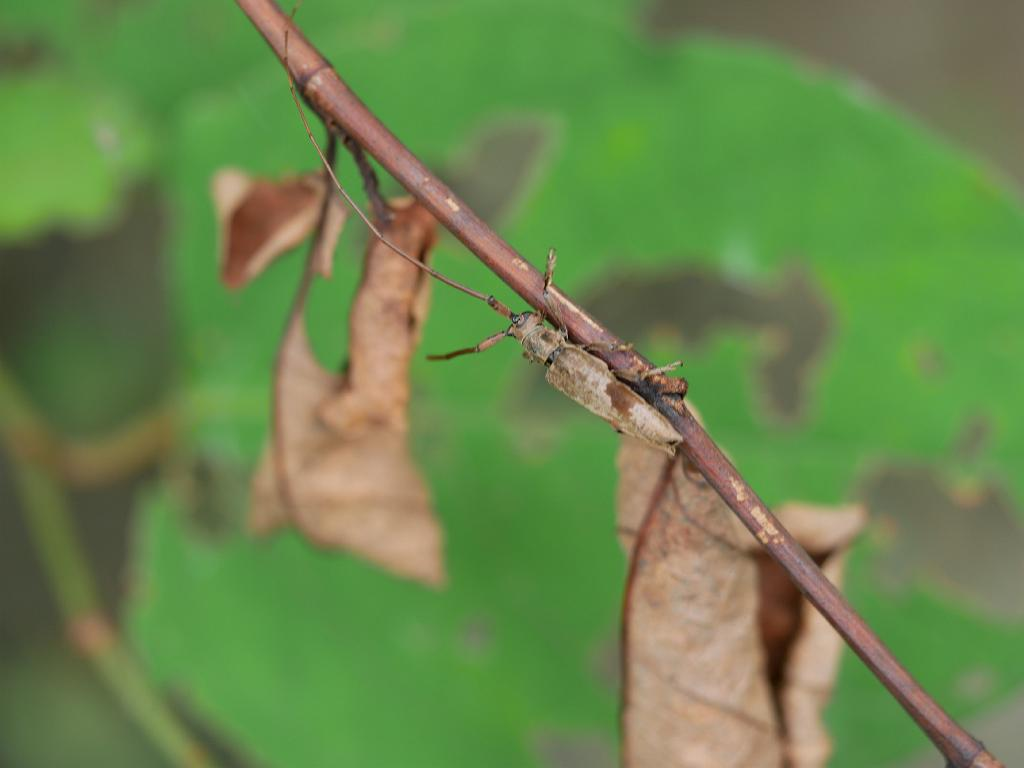

Scientific classification
- Domain: Eukaryota
- Kingdom: Animalia
- Phylum: Arthropoda
- Class: Insecta
- Order: Coleoptera
- Suborder: Polyphaga
- Infraorder: Cucujiformia
- Family: Cerambycidae
- Tribe: Lamiini
- Genus: Uraecha
- Species: U. bimaculata

Binomial name
- Uraecha bimaculata Thomson, 1864

= Uraecha bimaculata =

Species of beetle

Uraecha bimaculata is a species of beetle in the family Cerambycidae. It was described by James Thomson in 1864.

== Subspecies ==
- Uraecha bimaculata brevicornis Makihara, 1980
- Uraecha bimaculata bimaculata Thomson, 1864
