= Annamanum sikkimense =

Scientific classification
- Kingdom: Animalia
- Phylum: Arthropoda
- Class: Insecta
- Order: Coleoptera
- Suborder: Polyphaga
- Infraorder: Cucujiformia
- Family: Cerambycidae
- Genus: Annamanum
- Species: A. sikkimense

Binomial name
- Annamanum sikkimense Breuning, 1942

Species of beetle

Annamanum sikkimense is a species of beetle in the family Cerambycidae. It was described by Stephan von Breuning in 1942. It is known from India.
