= Annamanum humerale =

Scientific classification
- Kingdom: Animalia
- Phylum: Arthropoda
- Class: Insecta
- Order: Coleoptera
- Suborder: Polyphaga
- Infraorder: Cucujiformia
- Family: Cerambycidae
- Genus: Annamanum
- Species: A. humerale

Binomial name
- Annamanum humerale (Pic, 1934)

Synonyms
- Urecha humeralis Pic, 1934

Species of beetle

Annamanum humerale is a species of beetle in the family Cerambycidae. It was described by Maurice Pic in 1934. It is known from Vietnam.
