= Granulorsidis =

Scientific classification
- Kingdom: Animalia
- Phylum: Arthropoda
- Class: Insecta
- Order: Coleoptera
- Suborder: Polyphaga
- Infraorder: Cucujiformia
- Family: Cerambycidae
- Tribe: Monochamini
- Genus: Granulorsidis; Breuning, 1980

Diversity
- 3 spp. (see text)

Genus of beetles

Granulorsidis is a genus in the family Cerambycidae described by Stephan von Breuning in 1980. Its type species, Orsidis flavidosignatus, was described by Per Olof Christopher Aurivillius in 1927.

== Species ==
The genus contains the following species:

- Granulorsidis cariosus (Pascoe, 1866)
- Granulorsidis flavidosignatus (Aurivillius, 1927)
- Granulorsidis puncticollis (Fisher, 1935)
