= Uraecha gilva =

Scientific classification
- Domain: Eukaryota
- Kingdom: Animalia
- Phylum: Arthropoda
- Class: Insecta
- Order: Coleoptera
- Suborder: Polyphaga
- Infraorder: Cucujiformia
- Family: Cerambycidae
- Tribe: Lamiini
- Genus: Uraecha
- Species: U. gilva

Binomial name
- Uraecha gilva Yokoyama, 1966

Species of beetle

Uraecha gilva is a species of beetle in the family Cerambycidae. It was described by Yokoyama in 1966.

== Subspecies ==
- Uraecha gilva hachijoensis Hayashi, 1969
- Uraecha gilva gilva Yokoyama, 1966
