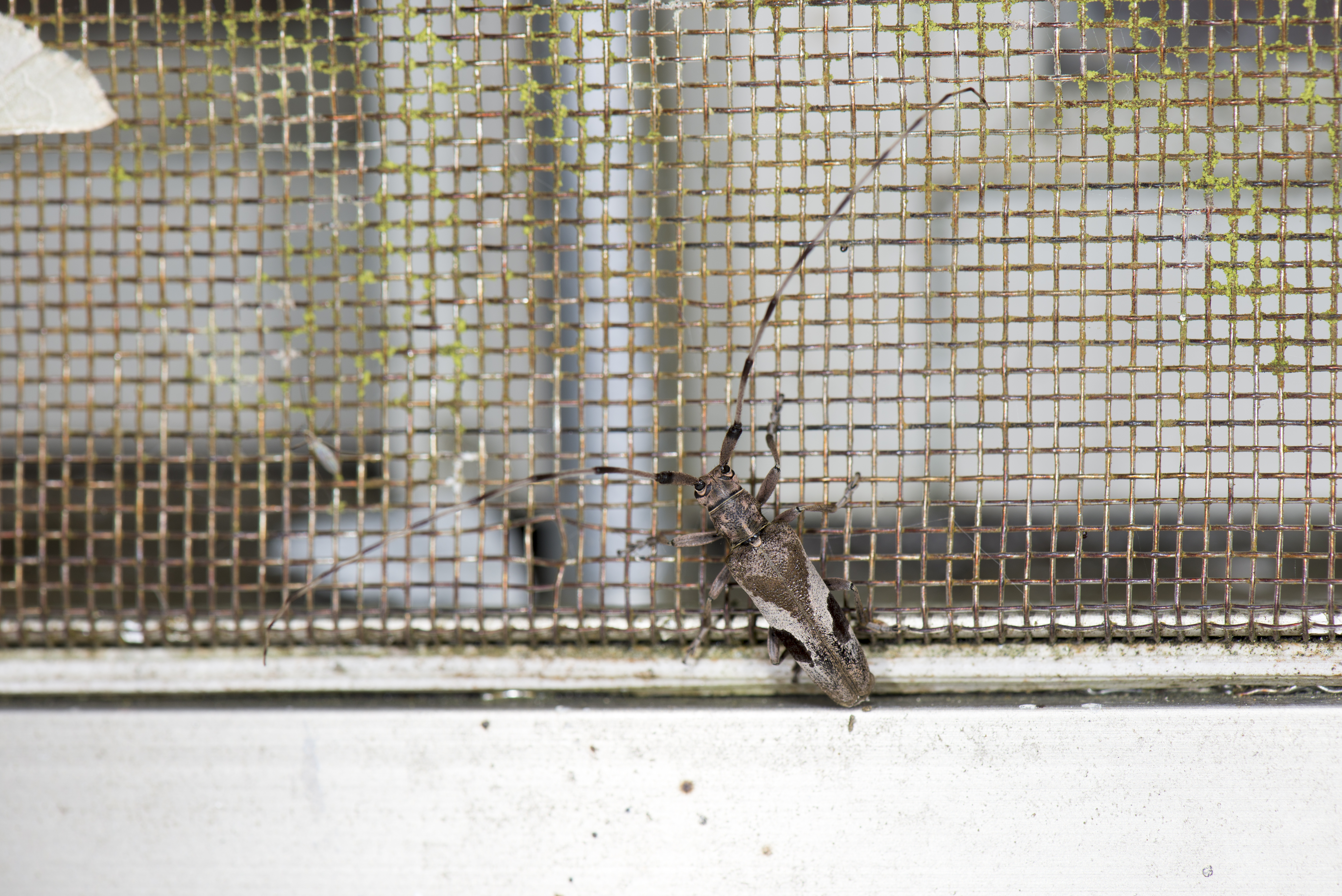

Scientific classification
- Kingdom: Animalia
- Phylum: Arthropoda
- Clade: Pancrustacea
- Class: Insecta
- Order: Coleoptera
- Suborder: Polyphaga
- Infraorder: Cucujiformia
- Family: Cerambycidae
- Genus: Uraecha
- Species: U. angusta

Binomial name
- Uraecha angusta (Pascoe, 1856)

Synonyms
- Monohammus angustus Pascoe, 1856; Uraecha angustus (Pascoe, 1865); Uræcha attenuata Pic, 1925

= Uraecha angusta =

Species of beetle

Uraecha angusta is a species of beetle in the family Cerambycidae. It was described by Francis Polkinghorne Pascoe in 1856, originally under the genus Monohammus. It is known from Vietnam, China and Taiwan. It contains the varietas Uraecha angusta var. horishana.

U. angusta feeds on Cinnamomum camphora.
