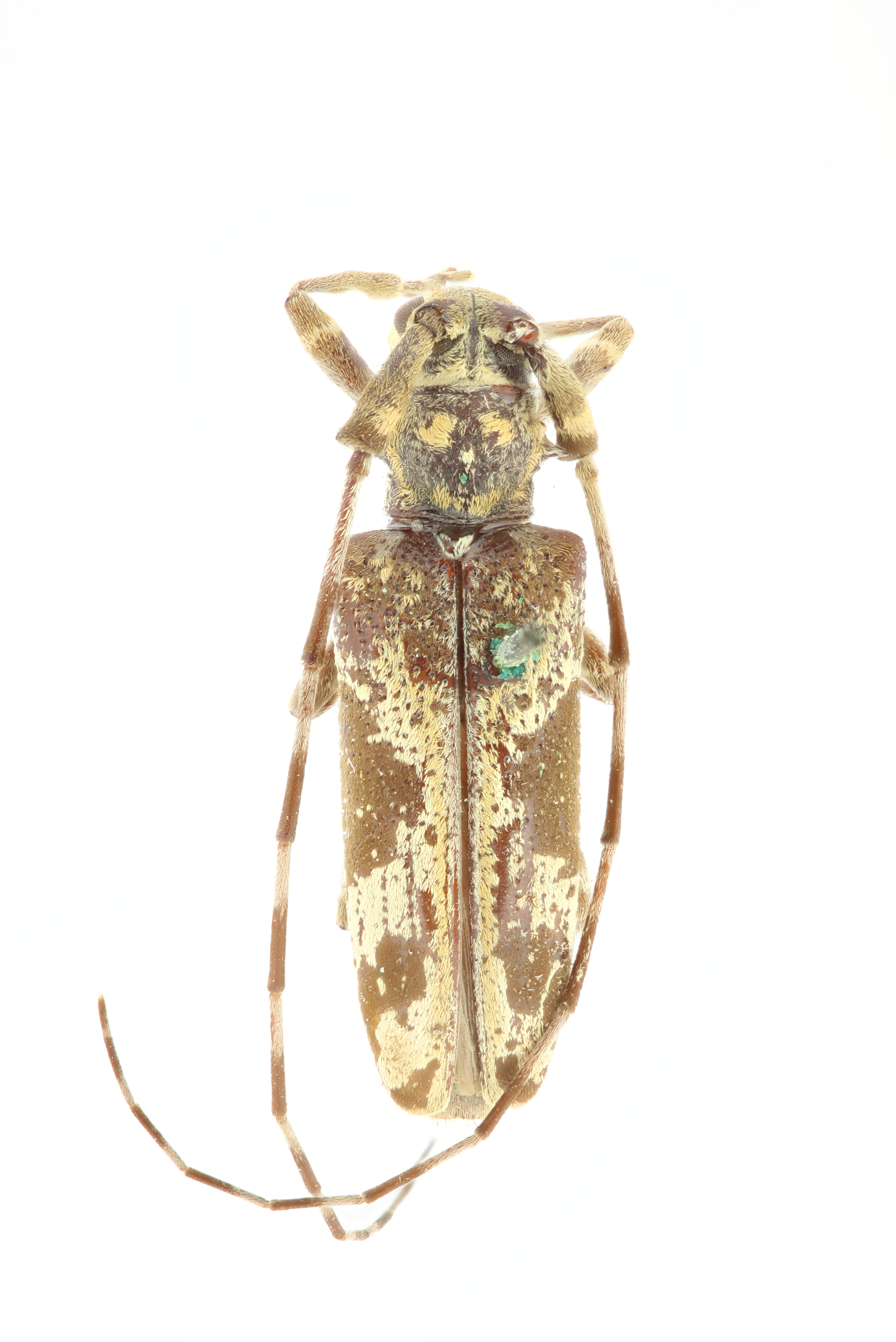

Scientific classification
- Domain: Eukaryota
- Kingdom: Animalia
- Phylum: Arthropoda
- Class: Insecta
- Order: Coleoptera
- Suborder: Polyphaga
- Infraorder: Cucujiformia
- Family: Cerambycidae
- Tribe: Lamiini
- Genus: Annamanum
- Species: A. thoracicum

Binomial name
- Annamanum thoracicum (Gahan, 1895)

Synonyms
- Annamanum vitalisi Pic, 1925

= Annamanum thoracicum =

Species of beetle

Annamanum thoracicum is a species of beetle in the family Cerambycidae. It was first described by Charles Joseph Gahan in 1895. It is known from Malaysia, Myanmar, Vietnam and Laos.
