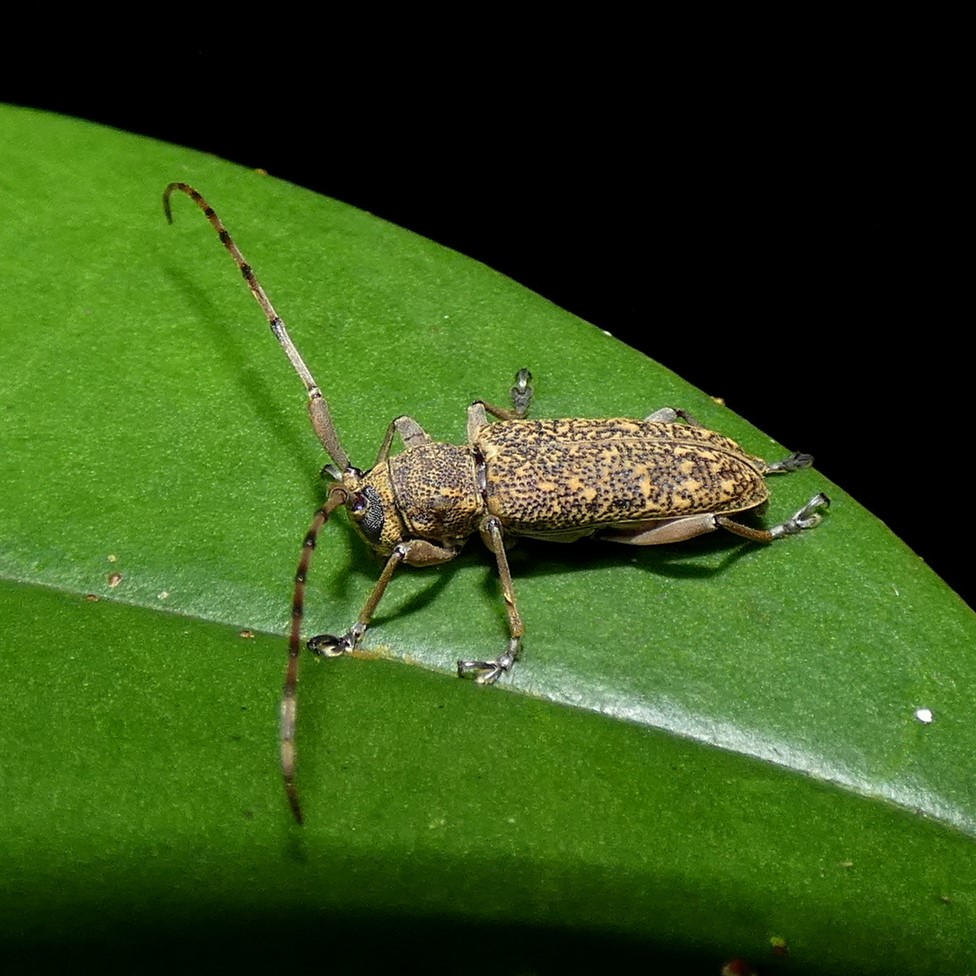

Scientific classification
- Kingdom: Animalia
- Phylum: Arthropoda
- Clade: Pancrustacea
- Class: Insecta
- Order: Coleoptera
- Suborder: Polyphaga
- Infraorder: Cucujiformia
- Family: Cerambycidae
- Genus: Granulorsidis
- Species: G. puncticollis

Binomial name
- Granulorsidis puncticollis (Fisher, 1935)

Synonyms
- Trachystola puncticollis Fisher, 1935; Acalolepta puncticollis (Fisher, 1935); Cypriola puncticollis (Fisher, 1935); Dihammus pustulatus Breuning, 1940

= Granulorsidis puncticollis =

Species of beetle

Granulorsidis puncticollis is a species of beetle in the family Cerambycidae. It was first described by Warren Samuel Fisher in 1935. It is known from Borneo (Malaysian Sabah, etc).
