= Annamanum albisparsum =

Scientific classification
- Domain: Eukaryota
- Kingdom: Animalia
- Phylum: Arthropoda
- Class: Insecta
- Order: Coleoptera
- Suborder: Polyphaga
- Infraorder: Cucujiformia
- Family: Cerambycidae
- Tribe: Lamiini
- Genus: Annamanum
- Species: A. albisparsum

Binomial name
- Annamanum albisparsum (Gahan, 1888)

Synonyms
- Monohammus albisparsum Gahan, 1888; Uraecha albonotata Pic, 1925

Species of beetle

Annamanum albisparsum is a species of beetle in the family Cerambycidae. It was described by Charles Joseph Gahan in 1888. It is known from China.
