= Orsidis privatus =

Scientific classification
- Kingdom: Animalia
- Phylum: Arthropoda
- Class: Insecta
- Order: Coleoptera
- Suborder: Polyphaga
- Infraorder: Cucujiformia
- Family: Cerambycidae
- Genus: Orsidis
- Species: O. privatus

Binomial name
- Orsidis privatus (Pascoe, 1866)

Synonyms
- Cereopsius privatus Pascoe, 1866

Species of beetle

Orsidis privatus is a species of beetle in the family Cerambycidae. It was described by Francis Polkinghorne Pascoe in 1866. It is known from Malaysia.
