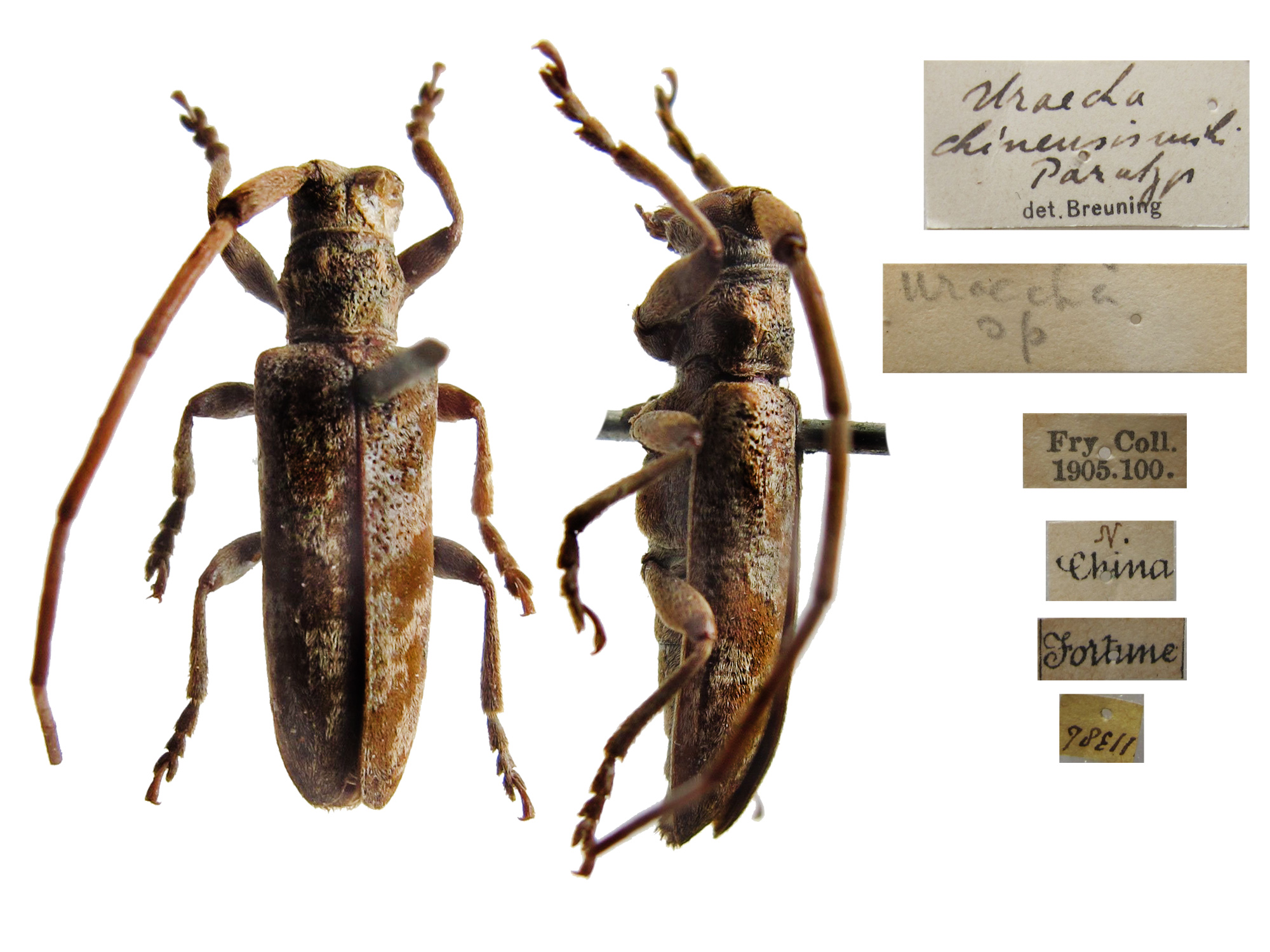

Scientific classification
- Kingdom: Animalia
- Phylum: Arthropoda
- Class: Insecta
- Order: Coleoptera
- Suborder: Polyphaga
- Infraorder: Cucujiformia
- Family: Cerambycidae
- Genus: Uraecha
- Species: U. chinensis

Binomial name
- Uraecha chinensis Breuning, 1935

= Uraecha chinensis =

Species of beetle

Uraecha chinensis is a species of beetle in the family Cerambycidae. It was described by Stephan von Breuning in 1935. It is known from China.
