= Uraecha yunnana =

Scientific classification
- Domain: Eukaryota
- Kingdom: Animalia
- Phylum: Arthropoda
- Class: Insecta
- Order: Coleoptera
- Suborder: Polyphaga
- Infraorder: Cucujiformia
- Family: Cerambycidae
- Tribe: Lamiini
- Genus: Uraecha
- Species: U. yunnana

Binomial name
- Uraecha yunnana Gressitt, 1942

Synonyms
- Uraecha perplexa Gressitt, 1942

Species of beetle

Uraecha yunnana is a species of beetle in the family Cerambycidae. It was described by Judson Linsley Gressitt in 1942. It is known from China.
