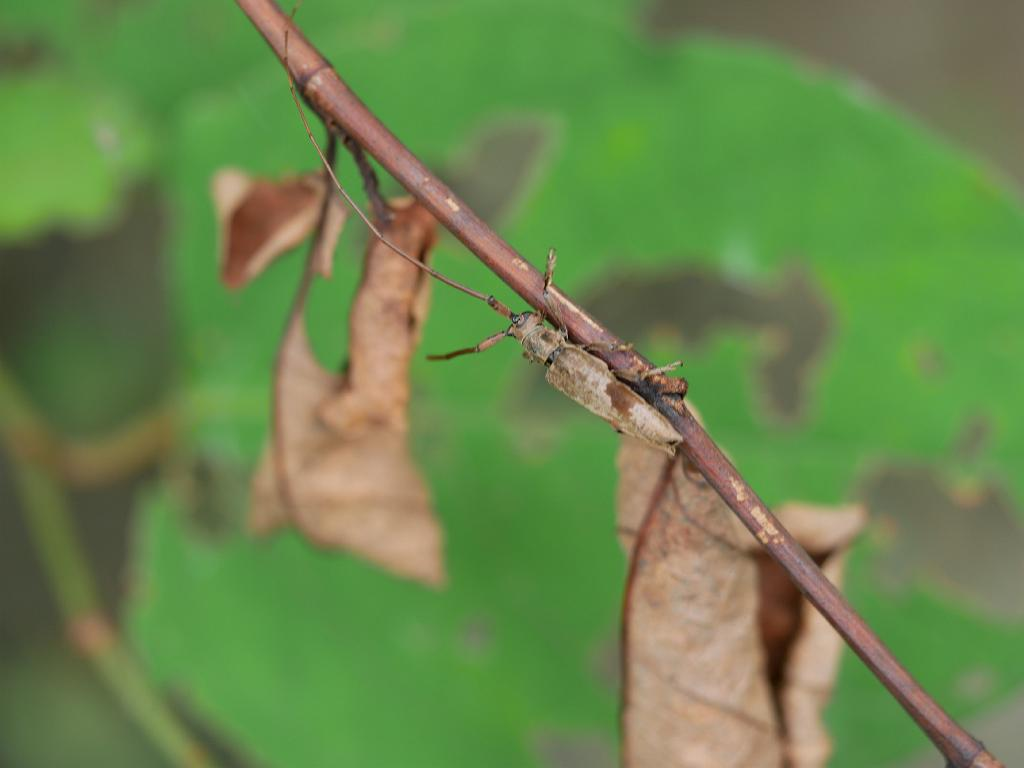
- Uraecha bimaculata

Scientific classification
- Kingdom: Animalia
- Phylum: Arthropoda
- Class: Insecta
- Order: Coleoptera
- Suborder: Polyphaga
- Infraorder: Cucujiformia
- Family: Cerambycidae
- Subfamily: Lamiinae
- Tribe: Lamiini
- Genus: Uraecha; Thomson, 1864

= Uraecha =

Genus of beetles

Uraecha is a genus of longhorn beetles of the subfamily Lamiinae, containing the following species:

- Uraecha albosparsa Pic, 1925
- Uraecha albovittata Breuning, 1956
- Uraecha angusta (Pascoe, 1856)
- Uraecha bimaculata Thomson, 1864
- Uraecha chinensis Breuning, 1935
- Uraecha curta Breuning, 1957
- Uraecha gilva Yokoyama, 1966
- Uraecha guerryi (Pic, 1903)
- Uraecha laosica Breuning, 1982
- Uraecha longzhouensis Wang & Chiang, 2000
- Uraecha obliquefasciata Chiang, 1951
- Uraecha ochreomarmorata Breuning, 1965
- Uraecha oshimana Breuning, 1954
- Uraecha perplexa Gressitt, 1942
- Uraecha punctata Gahan, 1888
- Uraecha yunnana Breuning, 1936
