= Uraecha obliquefasciata =

Scientific classification
- Domain: Eukaryota
- Kingdom: Animalia
- Phylum: Arthropoda
- Class: Insecta
- Order: Coleoptera
- Suborder: Polyphaga
- Infraorder: Cucujiformia
- Family: Cerambycidae
- Tribe: Lamiini
- Genus: Uraecha
- Species: U. obliquefasciata

Binomial name
- Uraecha obliquefasciata Chiang, 1951

Species of beetle

Uraecha obliquefasciata is a species of beetle in the family Cerambycidae. It was described by Chiang in 1951. It is known from China.
