= Uraecha albovittata =

Scientific classification
- Kingdom: Animalia
- Phylum: Arthropoda
- Class: Insecta
- Order: Coleoptera
- Suborder: Polyphaga
- Infraorder: Cucujiformia
- Family: Cerambycidae
- Genus: Uraecha
- Species: U. albovittata

Binomial name
- Uraecha albovittata Breuning, 1956

Species of beetle

Uraecha albovittata is a species of beetle in the family Cerambycidae. It was described by Stephan von Breuning in 1956. It is known from China.
