= Annamanum cardoni =

Scientific classification
- Kingdom: Animalia
- Phylum: Arthropoda
- Class: Insecta
- Order: Coleoptera
- Suborder: Polyphaga
- Infraorder: Cucujiformia
- Family: Cerambycidae
- Genus: Annamanum
- Species: A. cardoni

Binomial name
- Annamanum cardoni Breuning, 1953

Species of beetle

Annamanum cardoni is a species of beetle in the family Cerambycidae. It was described by Stephan von Breuning in 1953 from a specimen collected by Louis Cardon. It is known from India.
