= Orsidis proletarius =

Scientific classification
- Kingdom: Animalia
- Phylum: Arthropoda
- Clade: Pancrustacea
- Class: Insecta
- Order: Coleoptera
- Suborder: Polyphaga
- Infraorder: Cucujiformia
- Family: Cerambycidae
- Genus: Orsidis
- Species: O. proletarius

Binomial name
- Orsidis proletarius (Pascoe, 1858)

Synonyms
- Monohammus proletarius Pascoe, 1858; Orsidis incomptus Pascoe, 1866

Species of beetle

Orsidis proletarius is a species of beetle in the family Cerambycidae. It was described by Francis Polkinghorne Pascoe in 1858. It is known from Sulawesi and Moluccas.
