= Uraecha punctata =

Scientific classification
- Domain: Eukaryota
- Kingdom: Animalia
- Phylum: Arthropoda
- Class: Insecta
- Order: Coleoptera
- Suborder: Polyphaga
- Infraorder: Cucujiformia
- Family: Cerambycidae
- Tribe: Lamiini
- Genus: Uraecha
- Species: U. punctata

Binomial name
- Uraecha punctata Gahan, 1888

Species of beetle

Uraecha punctata is a species of beetle in the family Cerambycidae. It was described by Charles Joseph Gahan in 1888. It is known from India and Vietnam.
