= Annamanum yunnanum =

Scientific classification
- Kingdom: Animalia
- Phylum: Arthropoda
- Class: Insecta
- Order: Coleoptera
- Suborder: Polyphaga
- Infraorder: Cucujiformia
- Family: Cerambycidae
- Genus: Annamanum
- Species: A. yunnanum

Binomial name
- Annamanum yunnanum Breuning, 1947

Species of beetle

Annamanum yunnanum is a species of beetle in the family Cerambycidae. It was described by Stephan von Breuning in 1947. It is known from China.
