= Annamanum chebanum =

Scientific classification
- Domain: Eukaryota
- Kingdom: Animalia
- Phylum: Arthropoda
- Class: Insecta
- Order: Coleoptera
- Suborder: Polyphaga
- Infraorder: Cucujiformia
- Family: Cerambycidae
- Tribe: Lamiini
- Genus: Annamanum
- Species: A. chebanum

Binomial name
- Annamanum chebanum (Gahan, 1895)

Species of beetle

Annamanum chebanum is a species of beetle in the family Cerambycidae. It was described by Charles Joseph Gahan in 1895. It is known from China, Laos, Vietnam, India and Myanmar.
