= Uraecha guerryi =

Scientific classification
- Kingdom: Animalia
- Phylum: Arthropoda
- Class: Insecta
- Order: Coleoptera
- Suborder: Polyphaga
- Infraorder: Cucujiformia
- Family: Cerambycidae
- Genus: Uraecha
- Species: U. guerryi

Binomial name
- Uraecha guerryi (Pic, 1903)

Synonyms
- Annamanum guerryi (Pic, 1903); Eryssamena guerryi Pic, 1903

Species of beetle

Uraecha guerryi is a species of beetle in the family Cerambycidae. It was described by Maurice Pic in 1903, originally under the genus Eryssamena. It is known from China.
