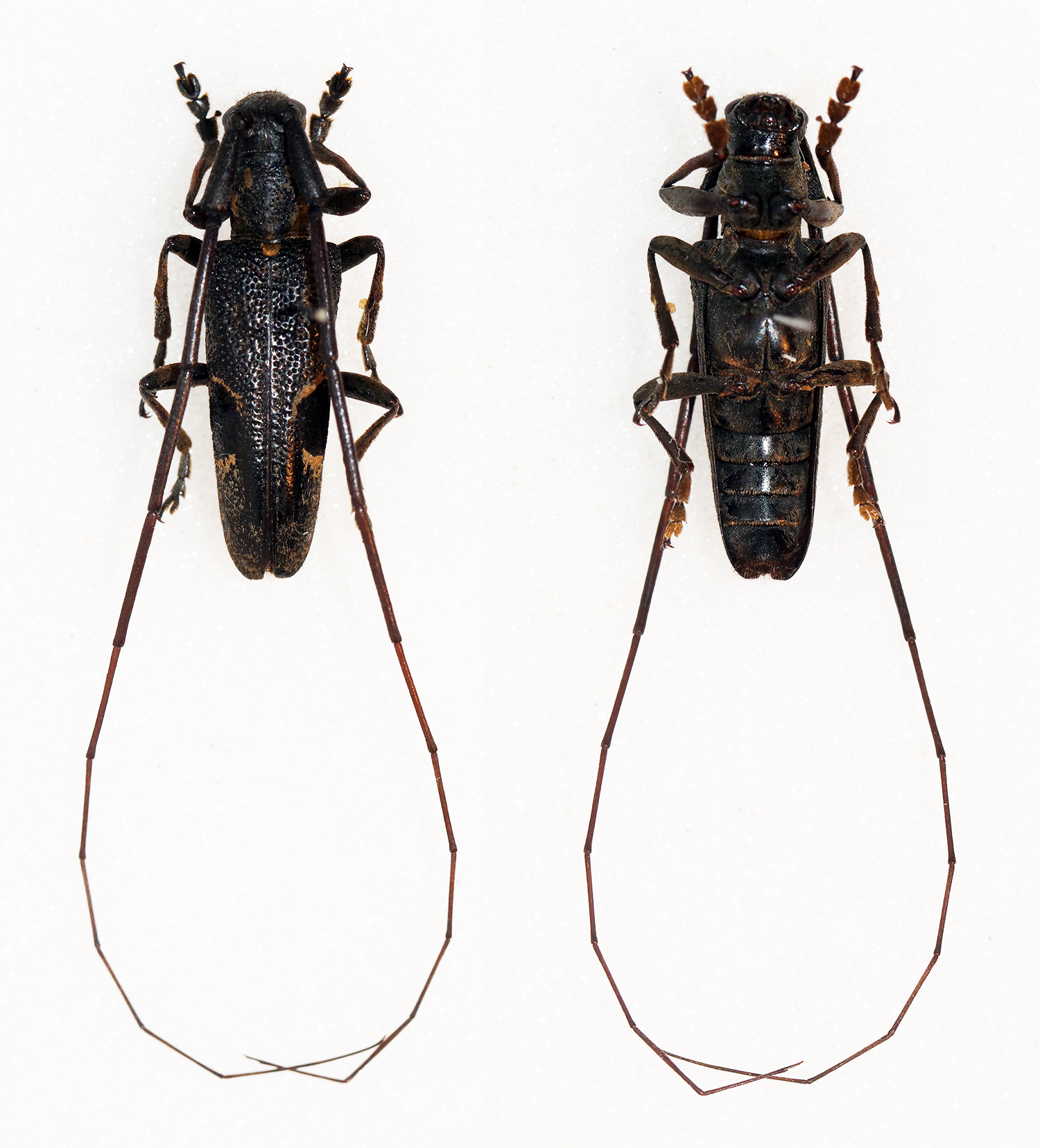

Scientific classification
- Kingdom: Animalia
- Phylum: Arthropoda
- Class: Insecta
- Order: Coleoptera
- Suborder: Polyphaga
- Infraorder: Cucujiformia
- Family: Cerambycidae
- Genus: Annamanum
- Species: A. lunulatum

Binomial name
- Annamanum lunulatum (Pic, 1934)

Synonyms
- Urecha lunulata Pic, 1934; Uraecha longzhouensis Wang & Chiang, 2000; Monochamus fruhstorferi Breuning, 1964

= Annamanum lunulatum =

Species of beetle

Annamanum lunulatum is a species of beetle in the family Cerambycidae. It was described by Maurice Pic in 1934. It is known from Vietnam and China.
