= Orsidis =

Scientific classification
- Kingdom: Animalia
- Phylum: Arthropoda
- Class: Insecta
- Order: Coleoptera
- Suborder: Polyphaga
- Infraorder: Cucujiformia
- Family: Cerambycidae
- Tribe: Lamiini
- Genus: Orsidis; Pascoe, 1866

Genus of beetles

Orsidis is a genus of longhorn beetles of the subfamily Lamiinae, containing the following species:

- Orsidis acutipennis Breuning, 1938
- Orsidis andamanensis Breuning, 1958
- Orsidis flavosticticus Breuning, 1938
- Orsidis privatus (Pascoe, 1866)
- Orsidis proletarius (Pascoe, 1858)
- Orsidis singaporensis Breuning, 1979
