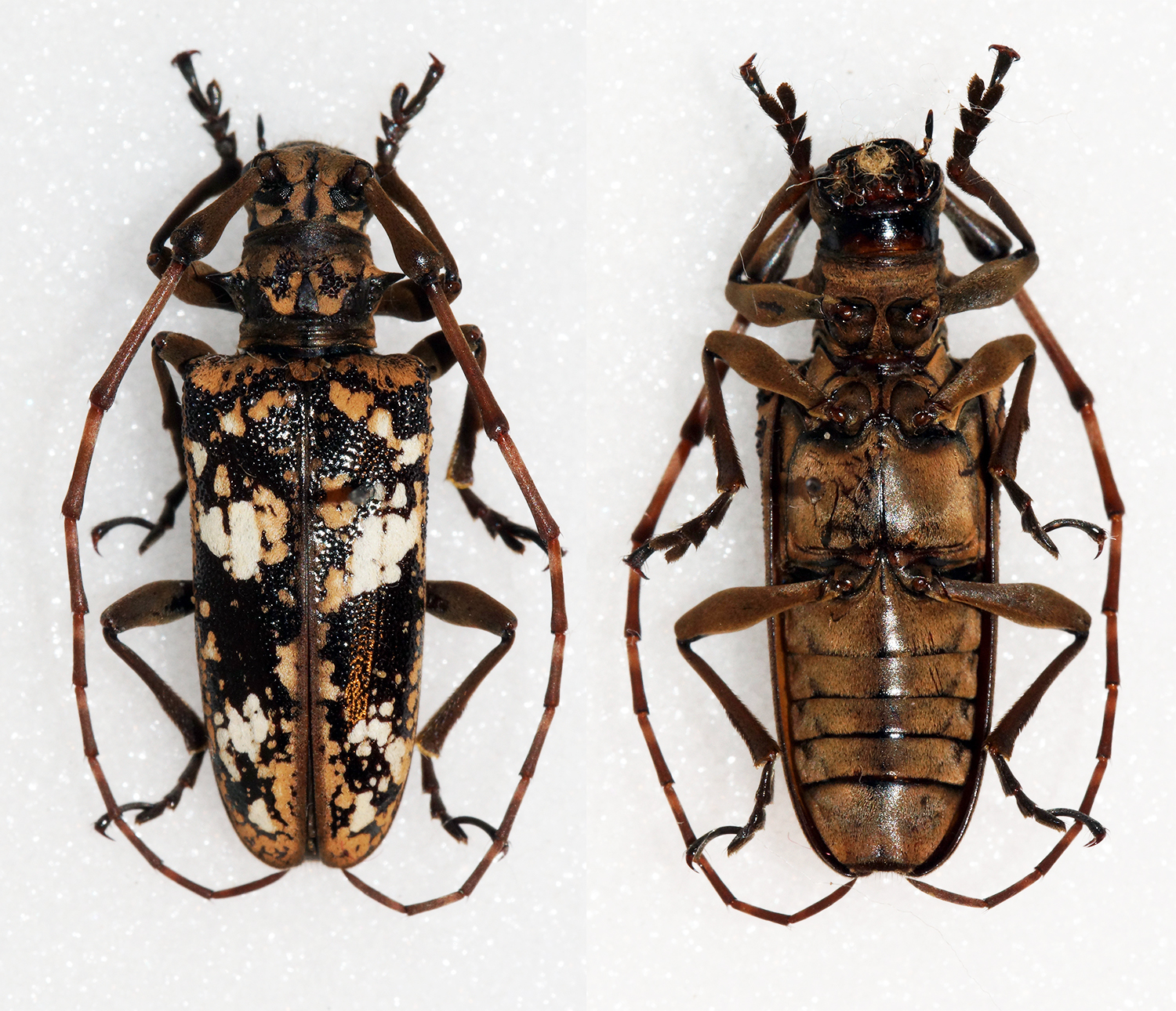

Scientific classification
- Kingdom: Animalia
- Phylum: Arthropoda
- Class: Insecta
- Order: Coleoptera
- Suborder: Polyphaga
- Infraorder: Cucujiformia
- Family: Cerambycidae
- Genus: Acalolepta
- Species: A. sumatrana

Binomial name
- Acalolepta sumatrana Breuning, 1940

= Acalolepta sumatrana =

Species of beetle

Acalolepta sumatrana is a species of beetle in the family Cerambycidae found in Asia in countries such as the Sumatra and Malaysia.
