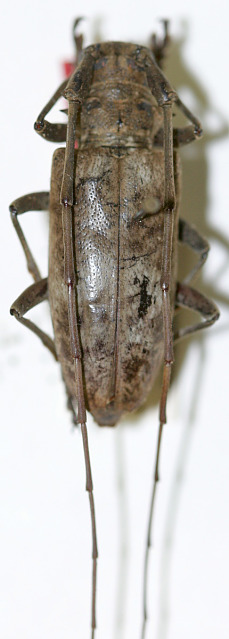

Scientific classification
- Kingdom: Animalia
- Phylum: Arthropoda
- Class: Insecta
- Order: Coleoptera
- Suborder: Polyphaga
- Infraorder: Cucujiformia
- Family: Cerambycidae
- Genus: Acalolepta
- Species: A. griseofasciata

Binomial name
- Acalolepta griseofasciata (Breuning, 1935)

Synonyms
- Dihammus griseofasciatus Breuning, 1935; Dihammus tultul Kriesche, 1936

= Acalolepta griseofasciata =

Species of beetle

Acalolepta griseofasciata is a species of beetle in the family Cerambycidae. It was described by Stephan von Breuning in 1935, originally under the genus Dihammus. It is known from Papua New Guinea, Vanuatu, and the Solomon Islands.

== Subspecies ==
- Acalolepta griseofasciata albinea Vitali & Goussey, 2014
- Acalolepta griseofasciata griseofasciata (Breuning, 1935)
- Acalolepta griseofasciata perscissa Vitali & Goussey, 2014
