= Acalolepta pseudodentifera =

Scientific classification
- Kingdom: Animalia
- Phylum: Arthropoda
- Class: Insecta
- Order: Coleoptera
- Suborder: Polyphaga
- Infraorder: Cucujiformia
- Family: Cerambycidae
- Genus: Acalolepta
- Species: A. pseudodentifera

Binomial name
- Acalolepta pseudodentifera (Breuning, 1942)

Synonyms
- Dihammus pseudodentifer Breuning, 1942

Species of beetle

Acalolepta pseudodentifera is a species of beetle in the family Cerambycidae, generally found in the IndoMalayan Realm. It was described by Stephan von Breuning in 1942.
