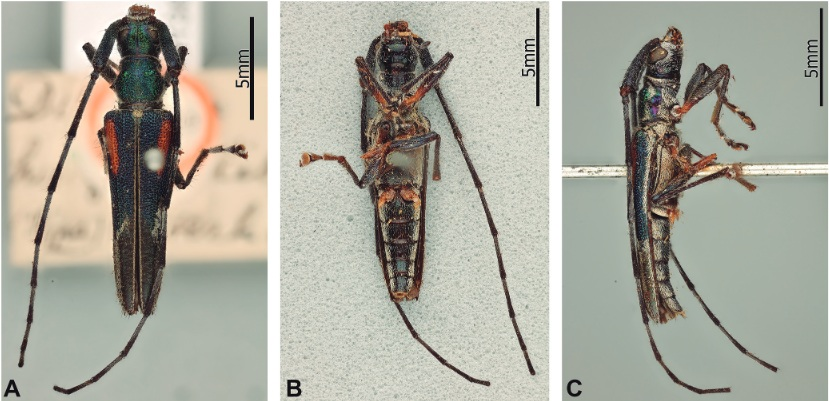

Scientific classification
- Kingdom: Animalia
- Phylum: Arthropoda
- Clade: Pancrustacea
- Class: Insecta
- Order: Coleoptera
- Suborder: Polyphaga
- Infraorder: Cucujiformia
- Family: Disteniidae
- Genus: Hovorestenia
- Species: H. humeralis

Binomial name
- Hovorestenia humeralis (Waterhouse, 1880)

Synonyms
- Distenia humeralis Waterhouse, 1880

= Hovorestenia humeralis =

Species of beetle

Hovorestenia humeralis is a species of beetle of the Disteniidae family. This species is found in Ecuador.

The females of this species are unknown. In general, humeralis is similar to Hovorestenia cleideae, with both species having an orange longitudinal band on the humeral region of the elytra.
