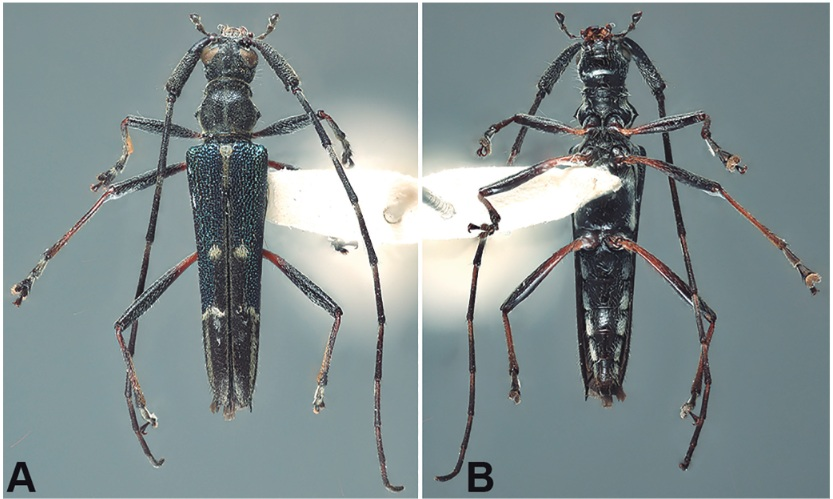

Scientific classification
- Kingdom: Animalia
- Phylum: Arthropoda
- Class: Insecta
- Order: Coleoptera
- Suborder: Polyphaga
- Infraorder: Cucujiformia
- Family: Disteniidae
- Genus: Hovorestenia
- Species: H. thalassina

Binomial name
- Hovorestenia thalassina Santos-Silva & Hovore, 2008

= Hovorestenia thalassina =

Species of beetle

Hovorestenia thalassina is a species of beetle in the family Disteniidae. This species is found in Ecuador.

The elytra have an oblique pubescent band on the posterior fourth and a pair of greyish pubescent spots at midlength. Adults are similar to Hovorestenia espilota.
