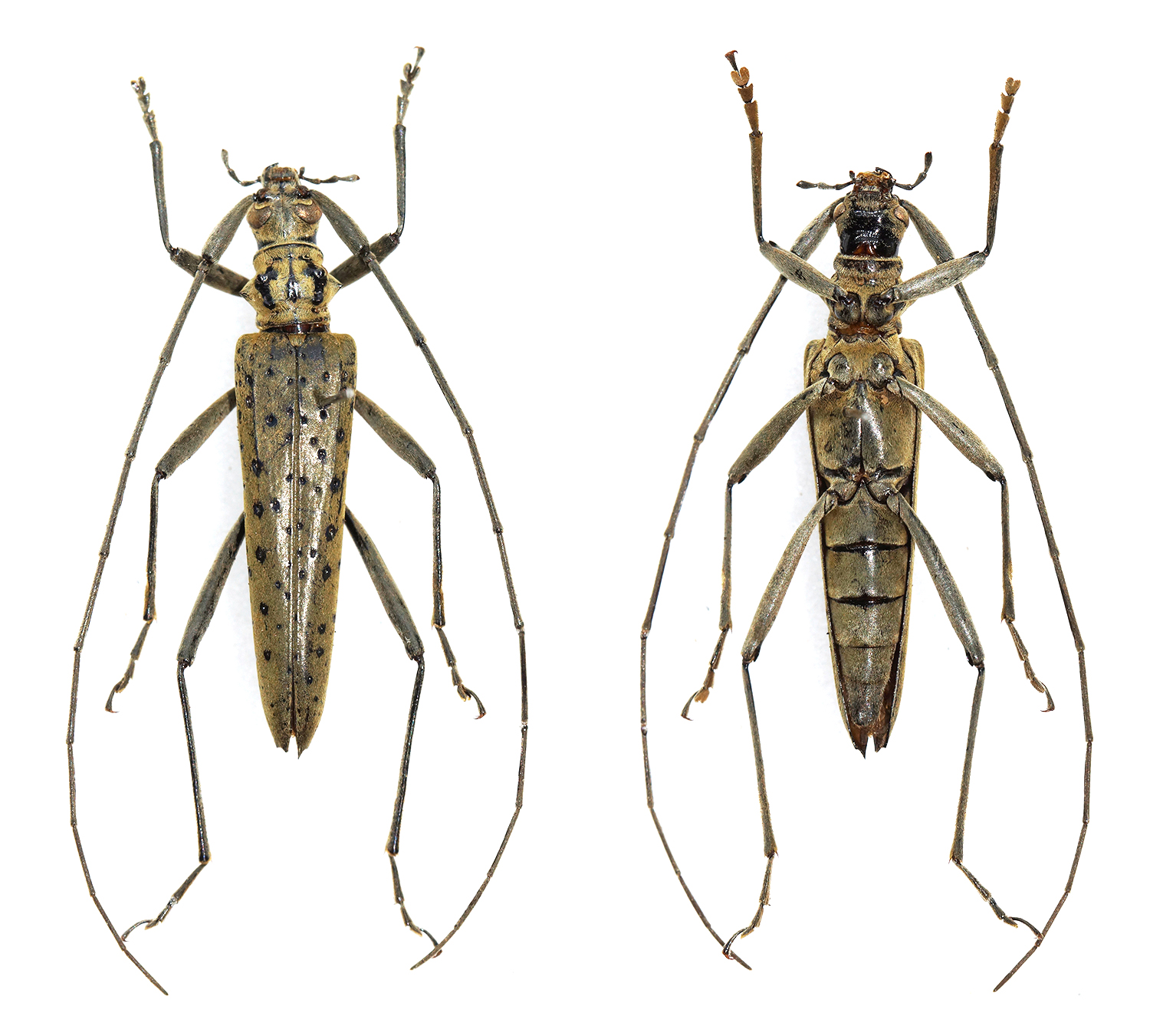

Scientific classification
- Kingdom: Animalia
- Phylum: Arthropoda
- Class: Insecta
- Order: Coleoptera
- Suborder: Polyphaga
- Infraorder: Cucujiformia
- Family: Disteniidae
- Genus: Distenia
- Species: D. nigrosparsa

Binomial name
- Distenia nigrosparsa Pic, 1914

= Distenia nigrosparsa =

Species of beetle

Distenia nigrosparsa is a species of beetle in the family Disteniidae. This species is found in China (Sichuan, Yunnan).
