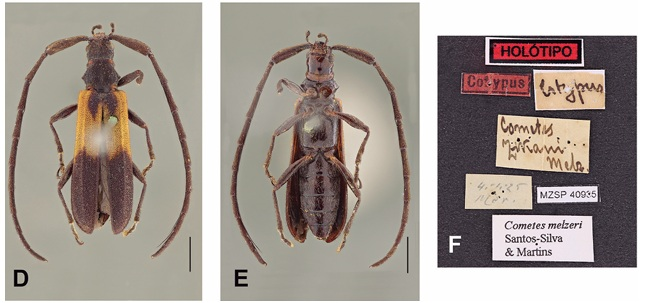

Scientific classification
- Kingdom: Animalia
- Phylum: Arthropoda
- Class: Insecta
- Order: Coleoptera
- Suborder: Polyphaga
- Infraorder: Cucujiformia
- Family: Disteniidae
- Genus: Cometes
- Species: C. melzeri

Binomial name
- Cometes melzeri Santos-Silva & Martins, 2004

= Cometes melzeri =

Species of beetle

Cometes melzeri is a species of beetle of the Disteniidae family. This species is found in Brazil.
