= Distenia japonica =

Scientific classification
- Kingdom: Animalia
- Phylum: Arthropoda
- Class: Insecta
- Order: Coleoptera
- Suborder: Polyphaga
- Infraorder: Cucujiformia
- Family: Disteniidae
- Genus: Distenia
- Species: D. japonica

Binomial name
- Distenia japonica Bates, 1873

Species of beetle

Distenia japonica is a species of beetle of the family Disteniidae. This species is found in Japan and the Russian Far East.
