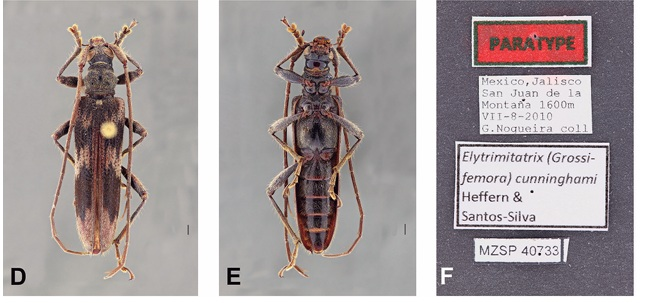

Scientific classification
- Kingdom: Animalia
- Phylum: Arthropoda
- Class: Insecta
- Order: Coleoptera
- Suborder: Polyphaga
- Infraorder: Cucujiformia
- Family: Disteniidae
- Genus: Elytrimitatrix
- Species: E. cunninghami

Binomial name
- Elytrimitatrix cunninghami Heffern & Santos-Silva, 2016

= Elytrimitatrix cunninghami =

Species of beetle

Elytrimitatrix cunninghami is a species of beetle of the Disteniidae family. This species is found in Mexico (Sinaloa, Jalisco).
