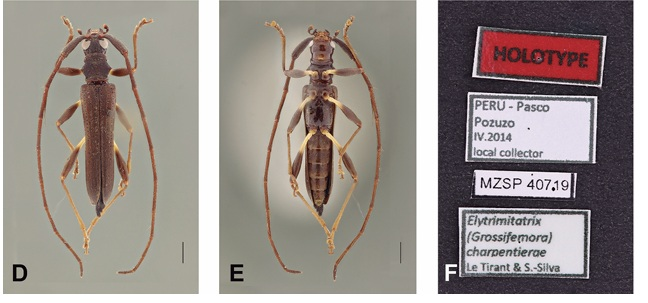

Scientific classification
- Kingdom: Animalia
- Phylum: Arthropoda
- Class: Insecta
- Order: Coleoptera
- Suborder: Polyphaga
- Infraorder: Cucujiformia
- Family: Disteniidae
- Genus: Elytrimitatrix
- Species: E. charpentierae

Binomial name
- Elytrimitatrix charpentierae Le Tirant & Santos-Silva, 2014

= Elytrimitatrix charpentierae =

Species of beetle

Elytrimitatrix charpentierae is a species of beetle of the Disteniidae family. This species is found in Peru.
