= Cyrtonops strbai =

Scientific classification
- Kingdom: Animalia
- Phylum: Arthropoda
- Clade: Pancrustacea
- Class: Insecta
- Order: Coleoptera
- Suborder: Polyphaga
- Infraorder: Cucujiformia
- Family: Disteniidae
- Genus: Cyrtonops
- Species: C. strbai

Binomial name
- Cyrtonops strbai Hergovits, 2022

Species of beetle

Cyrtonops strbai is a species of beetle of the family Disteniidae. This species is found in Laos and eastern Cambodia.

The elytra are unicoloured brown, while the rest of the body is reddish brown. The holotype is a male collected near Ban Khoun Ngeun in Khammouan Province, Laos, at about 300 m elevation, while a male paratype was collected near Sen Monorom in eastern Cambodia at 700 m elevation.

== Etymology ==
The species name is derived from the name of Milan Štrba, an expert on the family Cleridae, who caught the first specimen of this species.
