= Pseudocometes =

Scientific classification
- Kingdom: Animalia
- Phylum: Arthropoda
- Class: Insecta
- Order: Coleoptera
- Suborder: Polyphaga
- Infraorder: Cucujiformia
- Family: Disteniidae
- Tribe: Heteropalpini
- Genus: Pseudocometes; Villiers, 1958

Genus of beetles

Pseudocometes is a genus of disteniid beetle.

== Species ==
- Pseudocometes argutulus (Buquet, 1851)
- Pseudocometes basalis Villiers, 1958
- Pseudocometes harrisoni Le Tirant & Santos-Silva, 2014
