= Novantinoe =

Scientific classification
- Kingdom: Animalia
- Phylum: Arthropoda
- Class: Insecta
- Order: Coleoptera
- Suborder: Polyphaga
- Infraorder: Cucujiformia
- Family: Disteniidae
- Tribe: Disteniini
- Genus: Novantinoe; Santos-Silva & Hovore, 2007

Genus of beetles

Novantinoe is a genus of disteniid beetles.

== Species ==
- Novantinoe agriloides (Bates, 1885)
- Novantinoe apiculatra Botero & Gutiérrez, 2020
- Novantinoe bicolor (Thomson, 1864)
- Novantinoe birai Santos-Silva & Hovore, 2007
- Novantinoe chemsaki Santos-Silva & Hovore, 2007
- Novantinoe cotopaxiana Santos-Silva & Hovore, 2007
- Novantinoe cribristernis (Bates, 1885)
- Novantinoe cristinae Santos-Silva & Hovore, 2007
- Novantinoe darlingtoni (Fisher, 1942)
- Novantinoe decora Bezark & Santos-Silva, 2013
- Novantinoe denticornis (Bates, 1870)
- Novantinoe equatoriensis (Villiers, 1959)
- Novantinoe fabiolae Botero, Heffern & Santos-Silva, 2018
- Novantinoe falsa Heffern, Botero & Santos-Silva, 2023
- Novantinoe fulvopicta (Bates, 1885)
- Novantinoe germaini (Villiers, 1959)
- Novantinoe guyanensis (Villiers, 1959)
- Novantinoe hefferni Santos-Silva & Hovore, 2007
- Novantinoe hovorei Santos-Silva & Hovore, 2007
- Novantinoe iani Santos-Silva & Hovore, 2007
- Novantinoe jolyi Santos-Silva & Hovore, 2007
- Novantinoe lezamai Santos-Silva & Hovore, 2007
- Novantinoe lingafelteri Santos-Silva & Hovore, 2007
- Novantinoe mariahelenae Santos-Silva & Hovore, 2007
- Novantinoe mathani (Villiers, 1959)
- Novantinoe monnei Santos-Silva & Hovore, 2007
- Novantinoe morrisi Santos-Silva & Hovore, 2007
- Novantinoe noguerai Santos-Silva & Le Tirant, 2016
- Novantinoe oaxaquena Botero, Heffern & Santos-Silva, 2018
- Novantinoe payettei Santos-Silva & Le Tirant, 2016
- Novantinoe pegnai (Hüdepohl, 1989)
- Novantinoe peruviensis (Villiers, 1959)
- Novantinoe pilithorax Lingafelter, 2024
- Novantinoe pubescens Bezark, Santos-Silva & Botero, 2023
- Novantinoe puertoricensis (Lingafelter & Micheli, 2004)
- Novantinoe rileyi Santos-Silva & Hovore, 2007
- Novantinoe rufa (Villiers, 1959)
- Novantinoe solisi Santos-Silva & Hovore, 2007
- Novantinoe spinosa (Bates, 1885)
- Novantinoe thomasi Santos-Silva & Hovore, 2007
- Novantinoe tumidicollis (Villiers, 1959)
- Novantinoe unidentata (Villiers, 1959)
- Novantinoe vivida Botero & Almeida, 2019
- Novantinoe wappesi Santos-Silva & Hovore, 2007
