= Cometes (beetle) =

Scientific classification
- Kingdom: Animalia
- Phylum: Arthropoda
- Class: Insecta
- Order: Coleoptera
- Suborder: Polyphaga
- Infraorder: Cucujiformia
- Family: Disteniidae
- Tribe: Disteniini
- Genus: Cometes; Lepeletier & Audinet-Serville in Latreille, 1828

Genus of beetles

Cometes is a genus of disteniid beetles.

== Species ==
- Cometes carinatus Villiers, 1958
- Cometes hirticornis Lepeletier & Audinet-Serville, 1828
- Cometes mediovittipennis Santos-Silva & Tavakilian, 2009
- Cometes melzeri Santos-Silva & Martins, 2004
- Cometes monnei Hovore & Santos-Silva, 2007
- Cometes zikani Melzer, 1926
