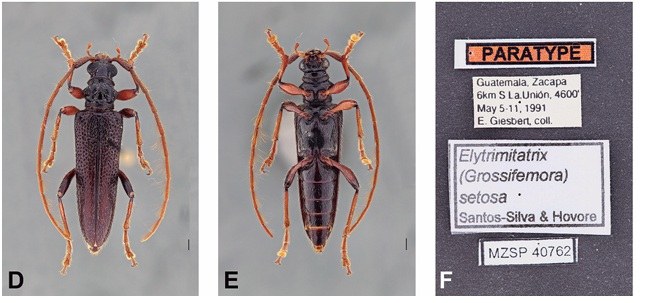

Scientific classification
- Kingdom: Animalia
- Phylum: Arthropoda
- Class: Insecta
- Order: Coleoptera
- Suborder: Polyphaga
- Infraorder: Cucujiformia
- Family: Disteniidae
- Genus: Elytrimitatrix
- Species: E. setosa

Binomial name
- Elytrimitatrix setosa Santos-Silva & Hovore, 2008

= Elytrimitatrix setosa =

Species of beetle

Elytrimitatrix setosa is a species of beetle of the Disteniidae family. This species is found in Honduras and Guatemala.
