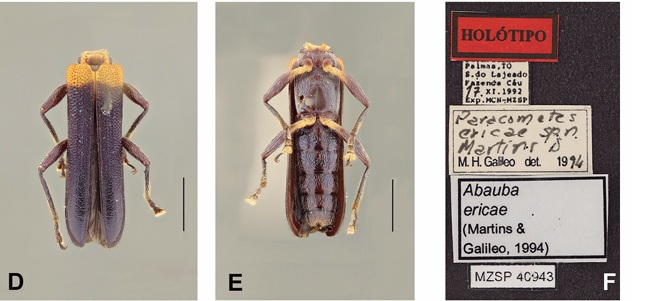

Scientific classification
- Kingdom: Animalia
- Phylum: Arthropoda
- Class: Insecta
- Order: Coleoptera
- Suborder: Polyphaga
- Infraorder: Cucujiformia
- Family: Disteniidae
- Genus: Abauba
- Species: A. ericae

Binomial name
- Abauba ericae (Martins & Galileo, 1994)

Synonyms
- Paracometes ericae Martins & Galileo, 1994; Cometes ericae

= Abauba ericae =

Species of beetle

Abauba ericae is a species of beetle of the Disteniidae family. This species is found in Brazil.
