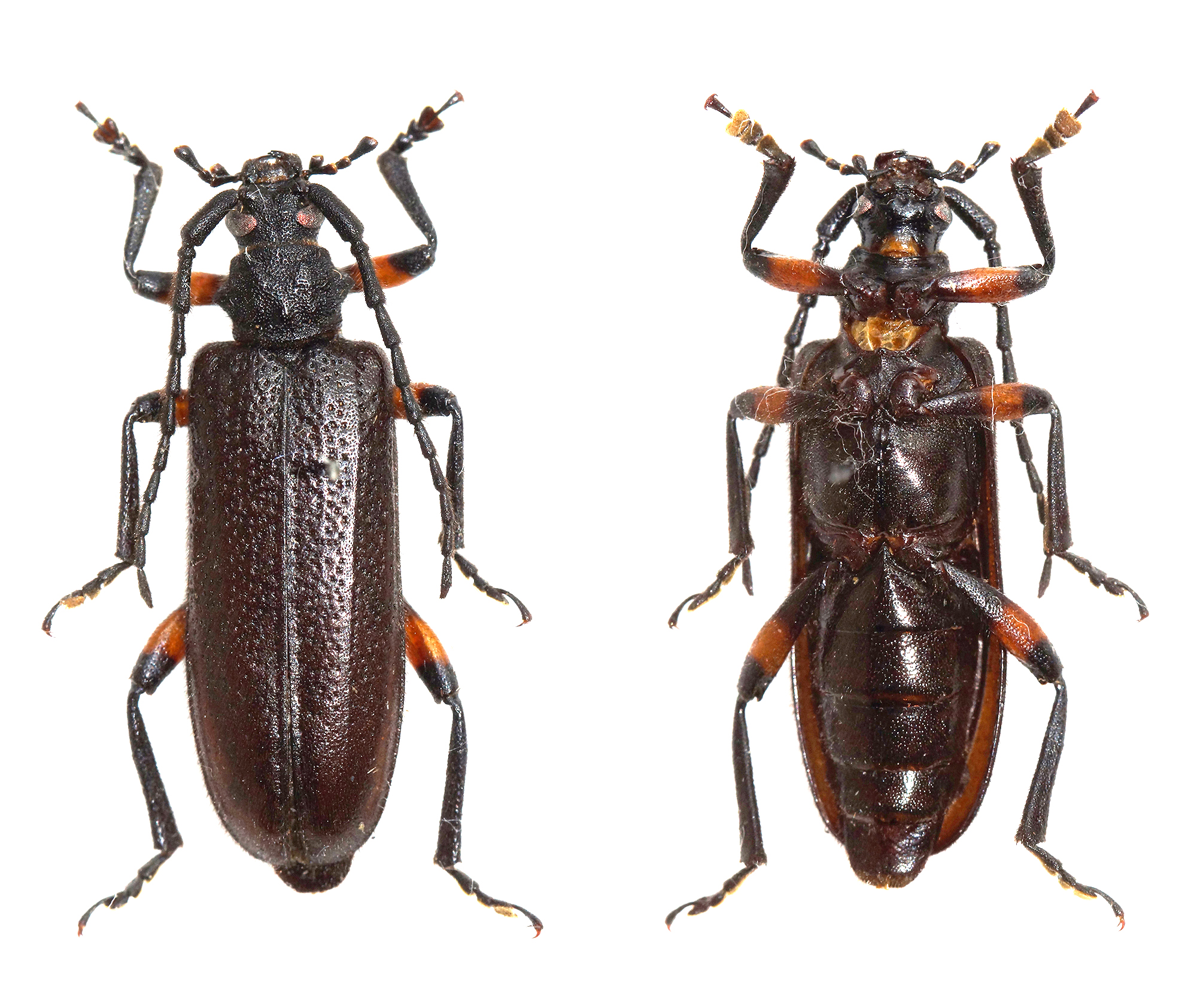

Scientific classification
- Kingdom: Animalia
- Phylum: Arthropoda
- Class: Insecta
- Order: Coleoptera
- Suborder: Polyphaga
- Infraorder: Cucujiformia
- Family: Disteniidae
- Genus: Cyrtonops
- Species: C. tonkineus

Binomial name
- Cyrtonops tonkineus Fairmaire, 1895

Synonyms
- Cyrtonops tonkineus Fairmaire, 1895; Cyrtonops oberthüri Clermont, 1935; Cyrtonops wuzhishanensis Z. Wang, 2014

= Cyrtonops tonkineus =

Species of beetle

Cyrtonops tonkineus is a species of beetle of the family Disteniidae. This species is found in Vietnam, China (Guangxi, Hainan) and Laos.
