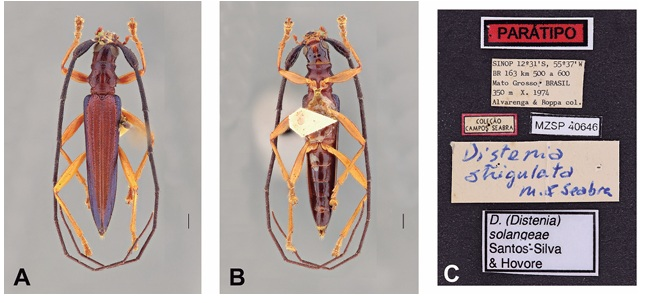

Scientific classification
- Kingdom: Animalia
- Phylum: Arthropoda
- Class: Insecta
- Order: Coleoptera
- Suborder: Polyphaga
- Infraorder: Cucujiformia
- Family: Disteniidae
- Genus: Distenia
- Species: D. solangeae

Binomial name
- Distenia solangeae Santos-Silva & Hovore, 2007

= Distenia solangeae =

Species of beetle

Distenia solangeae is a species of beetle in the family Disteniidae. This species is found in Brazil.
