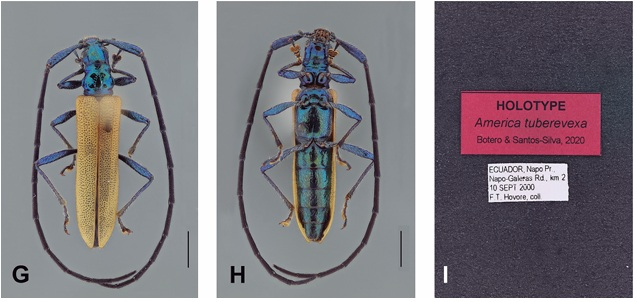

Scientific classification
- Kingdom: Animalia
- Phylum: Arthropoda
- Class: Insecta
- Order: Coleoptera
- Suborder: Polyphaga
- Infraorder: Cucujiformia
- Family: Disteniidae
- Genus: America
- Species: A. tuberevexa

Binomial name
- America tuberevexa Santos-Silva & Tavakilian, 2020

= America tuberevexa =

Species of beetle

America tuberevexa is a species of beetle of the Disteniidae family. This species is found in Ecuador.
