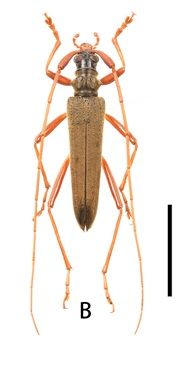
- Male
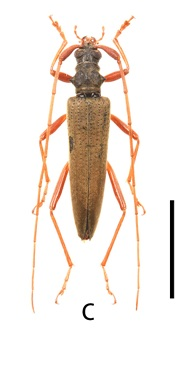
- Female

Scientific classification
- Kingdom: Animalia
- Phylum: Arthropoda
- Class: Insecta
- Order: Coleoptera
- Suborder: Polyphaga
- Infraorder: Cucujiformia
- Family: Disteniidae
- Genus: Distenia
- Species: D. fulvipennis

Binomial name
- Distenia fulvipennis Gressit, 1935

= Distenia fulvipennis =

Species of beetle

Distenia fulvipennis is a species of beetle of the family Disteniidae. This species is found in Thailand, Laos and China (Yunnan).

== Subspecies ==
- Distenia fulvipennis fulvipennis - Thailand
- Distenia fulvipennis murina Holzschuh, 2011 - Laos, China (Yunnan)
