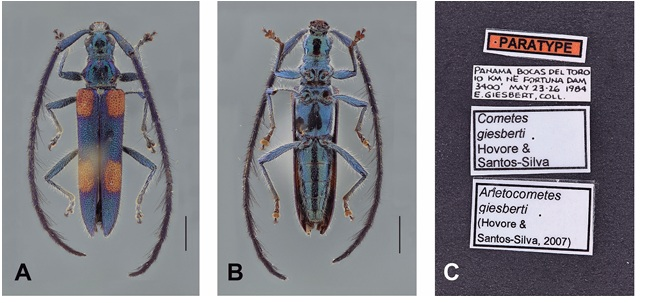

Scientific classification
- Kingdom: Animalia
- Phylum: Arthropoda
- Class: Insecta
- Order: Coleoptera
- Suborder: Polyphaga
- Infraorder: Cucujiformia
- Family: Disteniidae
- Genus: Arietocometes
- Species: A. giesberti

Binomial name
- Arietocometes giesberti (Hovore & Santos-Silva, 2007)

Synonyms
- Cometes giesberti Hovore & Santos-Silva, 2007

= Arietocometes giesberti =

Species of beetle

Arietocometes giesberti is a species of beetle of the Disteniidae family. This species is found in Panama and Costa Rica.
