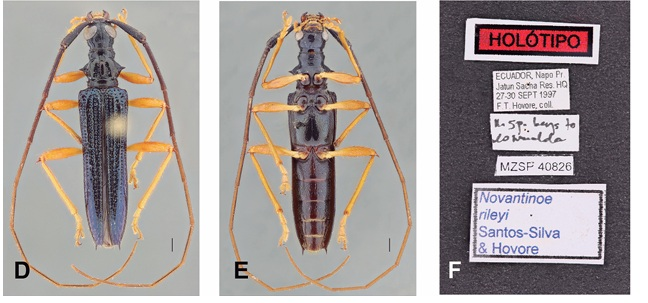

Scientific classification
- Kingdom: Animalia
- Phylum: Arthropoda
- Class: Insecta
- Order: Coleoptera
- Suborder: Polyphaga
- Infraorder: Cucujiformia
- Family: Disteniidae
- Genus: Novantinoe
- Species: N. rileyi

Binomial name
- Novantinoe rileyi Santos-Silva & Hovore, 2007

= Novantinoe rileyi =

Species of beetle

Novantinoe rileyi is a species of beetle of the Disteniidae family. This species is found in Ecuador and Colombia.
