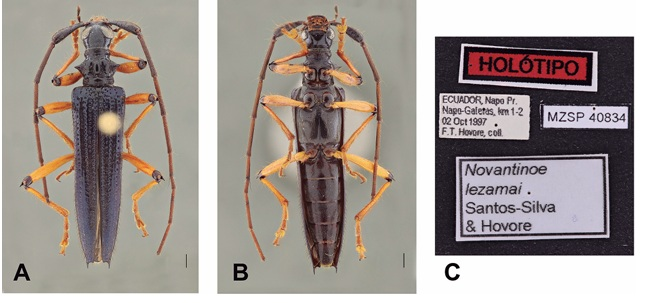

Scientific classification
- Kingdom: Animalia
- Phylum: Arthropoda
- Class: Insecta
- Order: Coleoptera
- Suborder: Polyphaga
- Infraorder: Cucujiformia
- Family: Disteniidae
- Genus: Novantinoe
- Species: N. lezamai

Binomial name
- Novantinoe lezamai Santos-Silva & Hovore, 2007

= Novantinoe lezamai =

Species of beetle

Novantinoe lezamai is a species of beetle in the family Disteniidae. This species is found in Colombia and Ecuador.
