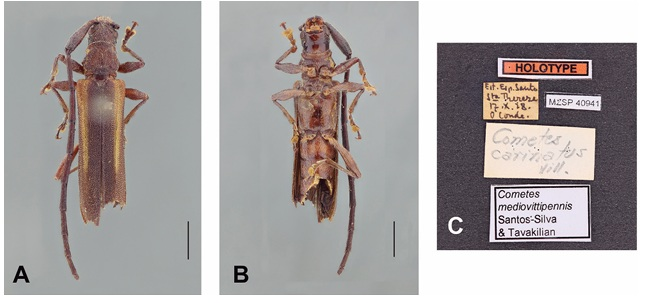

Scientific classification
- Kingdom: Animalia
- Phylum: Arthropoda
- Class: Insecta
- Order: Coleoptera
- Suborder: Polyphaga
- Infraorder: Cucujiformia
- Family: Disteniidae
- Genus: Cometes
- Species: C. mediovittipennis

Binomial name
- Cometes mediovittipennis Santos-Silva & Tavakilian, 2009

= Cometes mediovittipennis =

Species of beetle

Cometes mediovittipennis is a species of beetle of the Disteniidae family. This species is found in Brazil.
