= Dynamostes =

Scientific classification
- Kingdom: Animalia
- Phylum: Arthropoda
- Class: Insecta
- Order: Coleoptera
- Suborder: Polyphaga
- Infraorder: Cucujiformia
- Family: Disteniidae
- Tribe: Dynamostini
- Genus: Dynamostes; Pascoe, 1857

Genus of beetles

Dynamostes is a genus of disteniid beetle.

== Species ==
- Dynamostes audax Pascoe, 1857
