= America (beetle) =

Scientific classification
- Kingdom: Animalia
- Phylum: Arthropoda
- Class: Insecta
- Order: Coleoptera
- Suborder: Polyphaga
- Infraorder: Cucujiformia
- Family: Disteniidae
- Tribe: Disteniini
- Genus: America; Santos-Silva & Tavakilian, 2009

Genus of beetles

America is a genus of disteniid beetle.

== Species ==
- America aberlenci Santos-Silva & Tavakilian, 2009
- America amabilis (Martins & Galileo, 2001)
- America amethystina (Villiers, 1958)
- America berkovae Santos-Silva & Tavakilian, 2009
- America bicolor (Fisher, 1946)
- America biplagiata (Villiers, 1958)
- America columbiana (Villiers, 1958)
- America cuneata (Villiers, 1958)
- America festiva (Bates, 1885)
- America flavipennis (Buquet, 1851)
- America flavoviridis (Villiers, 1958)
- America hermieri Santos-Silva & Tavakilian, 2009
- America hilaris (Bates, 1885)
- America hovorei (Santos-Silva, 2007)
- America laetifica (Bates, 1870)
- America larrei Santos-Silva & Tavakilian, 2009
- America lingafelteri (Hovore & Santos-Silva, 2007)
- America marcelae (Hovore & Santos-Silva, 2007)
- America mariahelenae (Hovore & Santos-Silva, 2007)
- America morrisi (Hovore & Santos-Silva, 2007)
- America peruviana (Villiers, 1958)
- America pulcherrima (Bates, 1872)
- America quadrimaculata (Villiers, 1958)
- America solangeae (Hovore & Santos-Silva, 2007)
- America solisi (Hovore & Santos-Silva, 2007)
- America spinipennis (Villiers, 1958)
- America spinosa Botero & Santos-Silva, 2020
- America thomasi (Hovore & Santos-Silva, 2007)
- America thouvenoti Santos-Silva & Tavakilian, 2009
- America tuberevexa Botero & Santos-Silva, 2020
- America tumidicollis (Villiers, 1958)
- America wappesi Santos-Silva & Tavakilian, 2009
