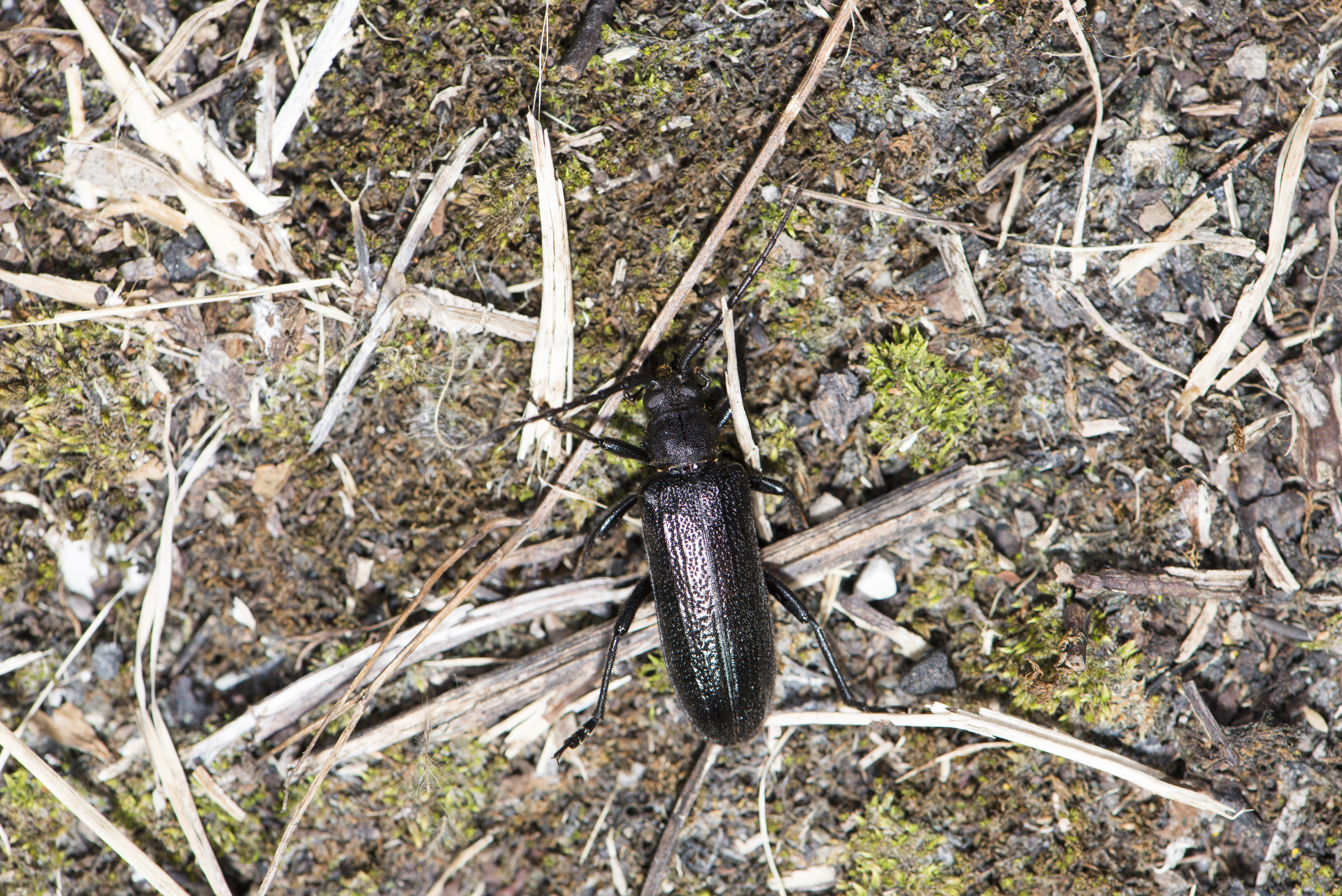

Scientific classification
- Kingdom: Animalia
- Phylum: Arthropoda
- Class: Insecta
- Order: Coleoptera
- Suborder: Polyphaga
- Infraorder: Cucujiformia
- Family: Disteniidae
- Genus: Cyrtonops
- Species: C. asahinai

Binomial name
- Cyrtonops asahinai Mitono, 1947

= Cyrtonops asahinai =

Species of beetle

Cyrtonops asahinai is a species of beetle of the family Disteniidae. This species is found in China (Shaanxi, Sichuan, Guizhou, Yunnan) and Taiwan.
