= Heteropalpus =

Scientific classification
- Kingdom: Animalia
- Phylum: Arthropoda
- Class: Insecta
- Order: Coleoptera
- Suborder: Polyphaga
- Infraorder: Cucujiformia
- Family: Disteniidae
- Tribe: Heteropalpini
- Genus: Heteropalpus; Buquet, 1843

Genus of beetles

Heteropalpus is a genus of disteniid beetle.

== Species ==
- Heteropalpus pretiosus Buquet, 1843
