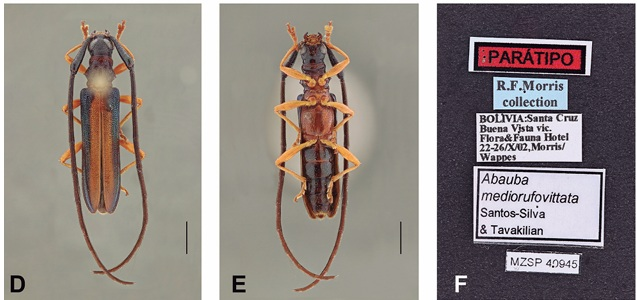

Scientific classification
- Kingdom: Animalia
- Phylum: Arthropoda
- Class: Insecta
- Order: Coleoptera
- Suborder: Polyphaga
- Infraorder: Cucujiformia
- Family: Disteniidae
- Genus: Abauba
- Species: A. mediorufovittata

Binomial name
- Abauba mediorufovittata Santos-Silva & Tavakilian, 2009

= Abauba mediorufovittata =

Species of beetle

Abauba mediorufovittata is a species of beetle in the family Disteniidae. This species is found in Bolivia, Brazil and Peru.
