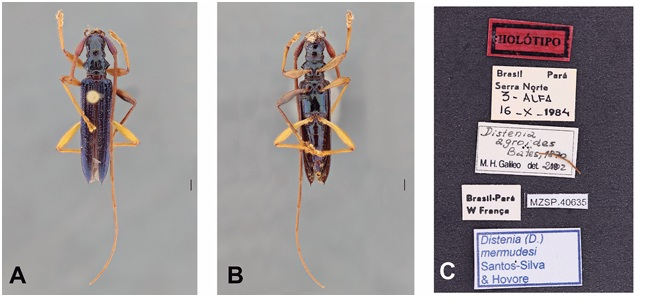

Scientific classification
- Kingdom: Animalia
- Phylum: Arthropoda
- Class: Insecta
- Order: Coleoptera
- Suborder: Polyphaga
- Infraorder: Cucujiformia
- Family: Disteniidae
- Genus: Distenia
- Species: D. mermudesi

Binomial name
- Distenia mermudesi Santos-Silva & Hovore, 2007

= Distenia mermudesi =

Species of beetle

Distenia mermudesi is a species of beetle of the Disteniidae family. This species is found in Bolivia and Brazil (Pará, Mato Grosso).
