= Arietocometes =

Scientific classification
- Kingdom: Animalia
- Phylum: Arthropoda
- Class: Insecta
- Order: Coleoptera
- Suborder: Polyphaga
- Infraorder: Cucujiformia
- Family: Disteniidae
- Tribe: Disteniini
- Genus: Arietocometes; Santos-Silva & Tavakilian, 2009

Genus of beetles

Arietocometes is a genus of disteniid beetle.

== Species ==
- Arietocometes apicalis (Waterhouse, 1880)
- Arietocometes giesberti (Hovore & Santos-Silva, 2007)
- Arietocometes nearnsi (Hovore & Santos-Silva, 2007)
- Arietocometes punctusdiaphoros Botero & Santos-Silva, 2021
- Arietocometes rileyi (Hovore & Santos-Silva, 2007)
- Arietocometes terryi Botero & Santos-Silva, 2021
- Arietocometes violaceicollis (Villiers, 1958)
- Arietocometes virgatus Botero & Santos-Silva, 2021
- Arietocometes wappesi (Santos-Silva & Martins, 2004)
