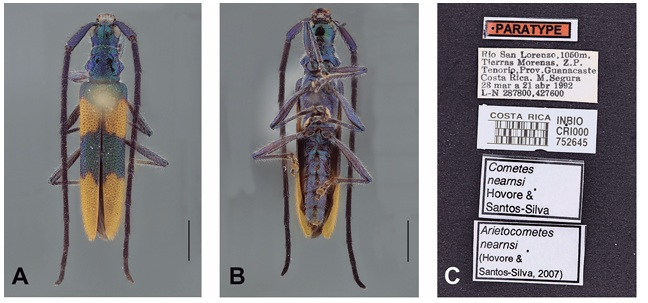

Scientific classification
- Kingdom: Animalia
- Phylum: Arthropoda
- Class: Insecta
- Order: Coleoptera
- Suborder: Polyphaga
- Infraorder: Cucujiformia
- Family: Disteniidae
- Genus: Arietocometes
- Species: A. nearnsi

Binomial name
- Arietocometes nearnsi (Hovore & Santos-Silva, 2007)

Synonyms
- Cometes nearnsi Hovore & Santos-Silva, 2007

= Arietocometes nearnsi =

Species of beetle

Arietocometes nearnsi is a species of beetle of the Disteniidae family. This species is found in Costa Rica and Panama.
