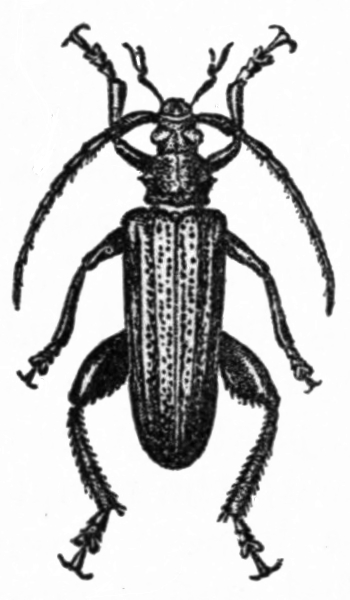

Scientific classification
- Kingdom: Animalia
- Phylum: Arthropoda
- Class: Insecta
- Order: Coleoptera
- Suborder: Polyphaga
- Infraorder: Cucujiformia
- Family: Disteniidae
- Genus: Cyrtonops
- Species: C. niger

Binomial name
- Cyrtonops niger Gahan, 1906

= Cyrtonops niger =

Species of beetle

Cyrtonops niger is a species of beetle of the Disteniidae family. This species is found in India (Manipur, Himachal Pradesh, Himalaya) and China (Tibet).
