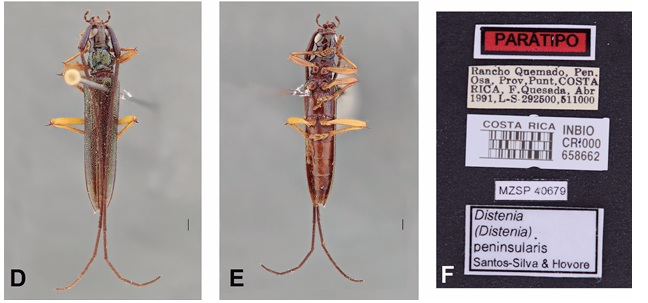

Scientific classification
- Kingdom: Animalia
- Phylum: Arthropoda
- Class: Insecta
- Order: Coleoptera
- Suborder: Polyphaga
- Infraorder: Cucujiformia
- Family: Disteniidae
- Genus: Distenia
- Species: D. peninsularis

Binomial name
- Distenia peninsularis Santos-Silva & Hovore, 2008

= Distenia peninsularis =

Species of beetle

Distenia peninsularis is a species of beetle of the Disteniidae family. This species is found in Costa Rica.
