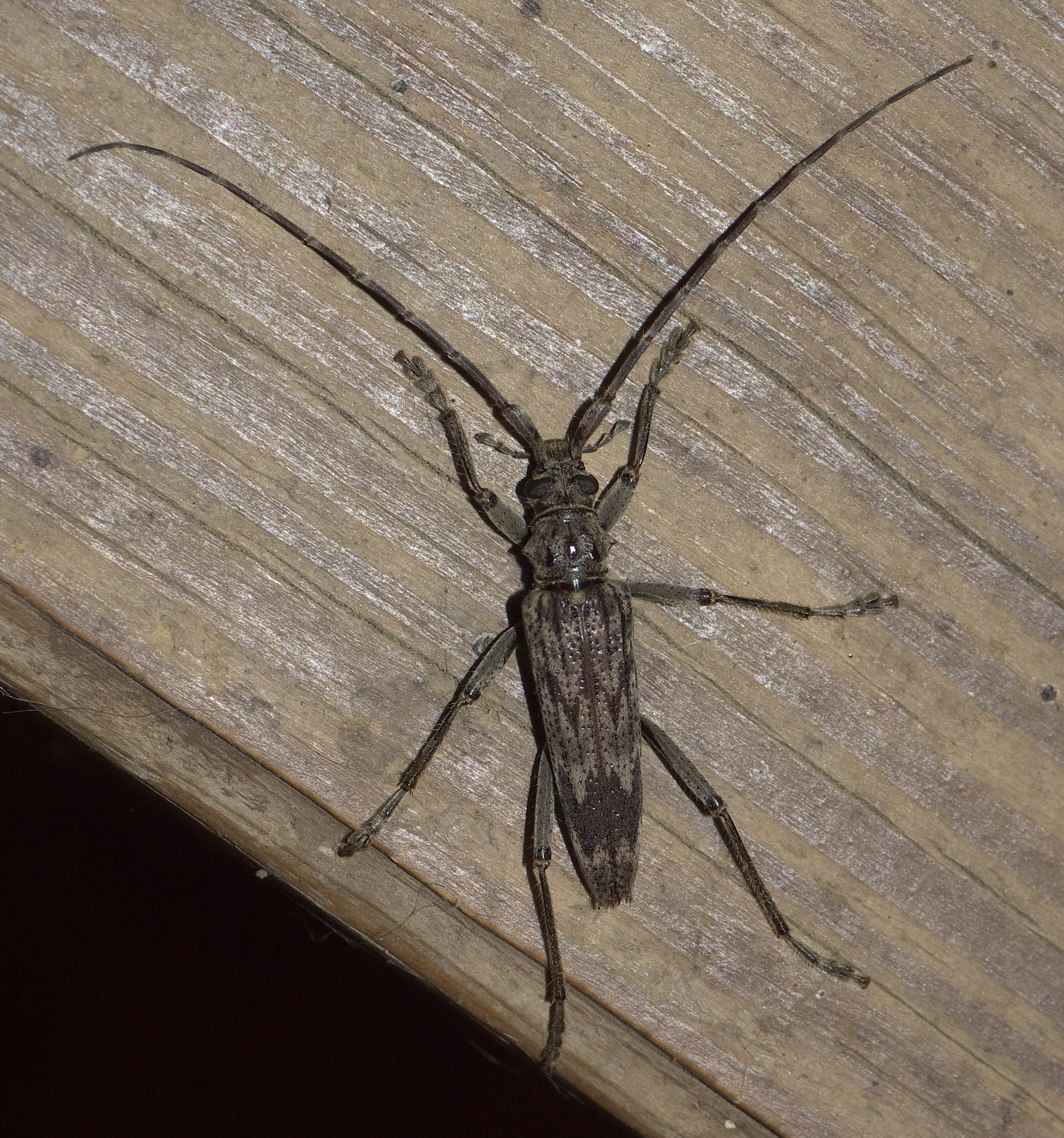
- Elytrimitatrix undata

Scientific classification
- Kingdom: Animalia
- Phylum: Arthropoda
- Class: Insecta
- Order: Coleoptera
- Suborder: Polyphaga
- Infraorder: Cucujiformia
- Family: Disteniidae
- Tribe: Disteniini
- Genus: Elytrimitatrix; Santos-Silva & Hovore, 2007

= Elytrimitatrix =

Genus of beetles

Elytrimitatrix is a genus of disteniid beetles.

== Species ==
- Subgenus Elytrimitatrix
  - Elytrimitatrix undata (Fabricius, 1775)
- Subgenus Grossifemora Santos-Silva & Hovore, 2007
  - Elytrimitatrix batesi (Villiers, 1959)
  - Elytrimitatrix bispinosa Santos-Silva & Hovore, 2008
  - Elytrimitatrix brevicornis (Bates, 1885)
  - Elytrimitatrix castanea Santos-Silva & Hovore, 2008
  - Elytrimitatrix charpentierae Le Tirant & Santos-Silva, 2014
  - Elytrimitatrix chimalapensis Pérez-Flores & Botero, 2022
  - Elytrimitatrix chrysostigma (Bates, 1872)
  - Elytrimitatrix cinnamea Santos-Silva & Hovore, 2008
  - Elytrimitatrix clavata Santos-Silva & Hovore, 2008
  - Elytrimitatrix cunninghami Heffern & Santos-Silva, 2016
  - Elytrimitatrix curoei Santos-Silva & Le Tirant, 2016
  - Elytrimitatrix dilatata Heffern, Botero & Santos-Silva, 2023
  - Elytrimitatrix franki Botero & Santos-Silva, 2020
  - Elytrimitatrix fuscula (Bates, 1885)
  - Elytrimitatrix geniculata (Bates, 1872)
  - Elytrimitatrix giesberti Santos-Silva & Hovore, 2008
  - Elytrimitatrix guatemalana Santos-Silva & Hovore, 2008
  - Elytrimitatrix guisayotea Santos-Silva & Hovore, 2008
  - Elytrimitatrix hefferni Santos-Silva & Hovore, 2008
  - Elytrimitatrix hoegei (Bates, 1885)
  - Elytrimitatrix hondurenha Santos-Silva & Hovore, 2008
  - Elytrimitatrix incognita Santos-Silva & Hovore, 2008
  - Elytrimitatrix irregularis (Linsley, 1935)
  - Elytrimitatrix lineatopora (Bates, 1880)
  - Elytrimitatrix linsleyi Santos-Silva & Hovore, 2008
  - Elytrimitatrix maculata Botero & Santos-Silva, 2022
  - Elytrimitatrix mexicana Santos-Silva & Hovore, 2008
  - Elytrimitatrix michelii Santos-Silva & Hovore, 2008
  - Elytrimitatrix nearnsi Santos-Silva & Hovore, 2008
  - Elytrimitatrix nigrella (Bates, 1880)
  - Elytrimitatrix nogueirai Heffern & Santos-Silva, 2016
  - Elytrimitatrix pictipes (Bates, 1885)
  - Elytrimitatrix pseudosimplex Santos-Silva & Hovore, 2008
  - Elytrimitatrix pseudovittata Santos-Silva & Hovore, 2008
  - Elytrimitatrix pubescens Santos-Silva & Hovore, 2008
  - Elytrimitatrix punctiventris (Bates, 1885)
  - Elytrimitatrix sauria Santos-Silva & Hovore, 2008
  - Elytrimitatrix setosa Santos-Silva & Hovore, 2008
  - Elytrimitatrix sharonae Santos-Silva & Hovore, 2008
  - Elytrimitatrix simplex (Bates, 1885)
  - Elytrimitatrix spinifemora Santos-Silva & Hovore, 2008
  - Elytrimitatrix trifasciata (Bates, 1892)
  - Elytrimitatrix violacea Santos-Silva & Hovore, 2008
  - Elytrimitatrix vittata (Bates, 1880)
