= Aiurasyma =

Scientific classification
- Kingdom: Animalia
- Phylum: Arthropoda
- Class: Insecta
- Order: Coleoptera
- Suborder: Polyphaga
- Infraorder: Cucujiformia
- Family: Disteniidae
- Tribe: Dynamostini
- Genus: Aiurasyma; Martins & Galileo, 2001

Genus of beetles

Aiurasyma is a genus of disteniid beetles.

== Species ==
- Aiurasyma potira Martins & Galileo, 2001
- Aiurasyma santandereana Botero & Almeida, 2019
