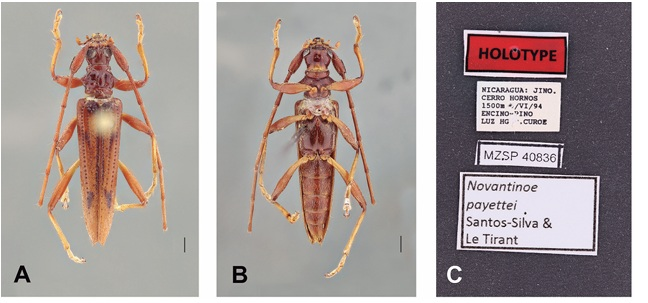

Scientific classification
- Kingdom: Animalia
- Phylum: Arthropoda
- Class: Insecta
- Order: Coleoptera
- Suborder: Polyphaga
- Infraorder: Cucujiformia
- Family: Disteniidae
- Genus: Novantinoe
- Species: N. payettei

Binomial name
- Novantinoe payettei Santos-Silva & Le Tirant, 2016

= Novantinoe payettei =

Species of beetle

Novantinoe payettei is a species of beetle of the Disteniidae family. This species is found in Nicaragua.
