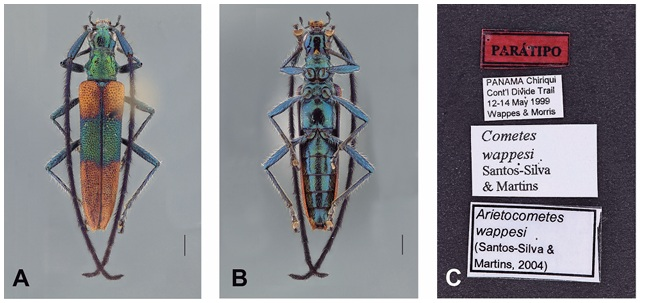

Scientific classification
- Kingdom: Animalia
- Phylum: Arthropoda
- Class: Insecta
- Order: Coleoptera
- Suborder: Polyphaga
- Infraorder: Cucujiformia
- Family: Disteniidae
- Genus: Arietocometes
- Species: A. wappesi

Binomial name
- Arietocometes wappesi (Santos-Silva & Martins, 2004)

Synonyms
- Cometes wappesi Santos-Silva & Martins, 2004

= Arietocometes wappesi =

Species of beetle

Arietocometes wappesi is a species of beetle of the Disteniidae family. This species is found in Panama.
