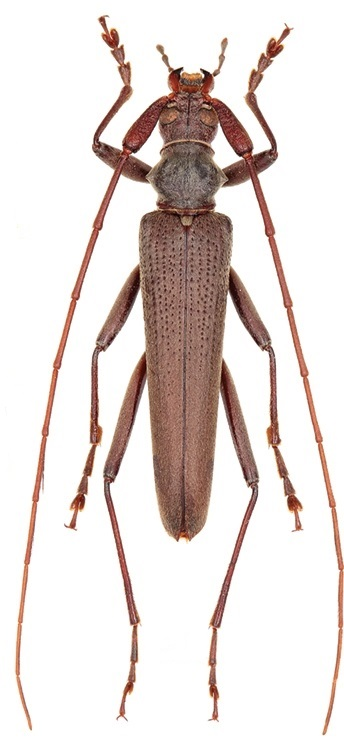

Scientific classification
- Kingdom: Animalia
- Phylum: Arthropoda
- Clade: Pancrustacea
- Class: Insecta
- Order: Coleoptera
- Suborder: Polyphaga
- Infraorder: Cucujiformia
- Family: Disteniidae
- Genus: Distenia
- Species: D. gracilis

Binomial name
- Distenia gracilis (Blessig, 1872)

Synonyms
- Apheles gracilis Blessig, 1872

= Distenia gracilis =

Species of beetle

Distenia gracilis is a species of beetle of the Disteniidae family. This species is found in northern China (Heilongjiang, Jilin, Liaoning), South Korea, North Korea and the Russian Far East.

== Genomics ==
A chromosome-level genome assembly for Distenia gracilis was published in 2026, representing the first reference genome for the family Disteniidae. The genome size is approximately 1.89 Gb, with 97.1% of the assembly anchored to 10 chromosomes. The assembly has a BUSCO completeness of 99.27%, and 77,131 protein-coding genes were predicted, of which 33,643 were functionally annotated.
