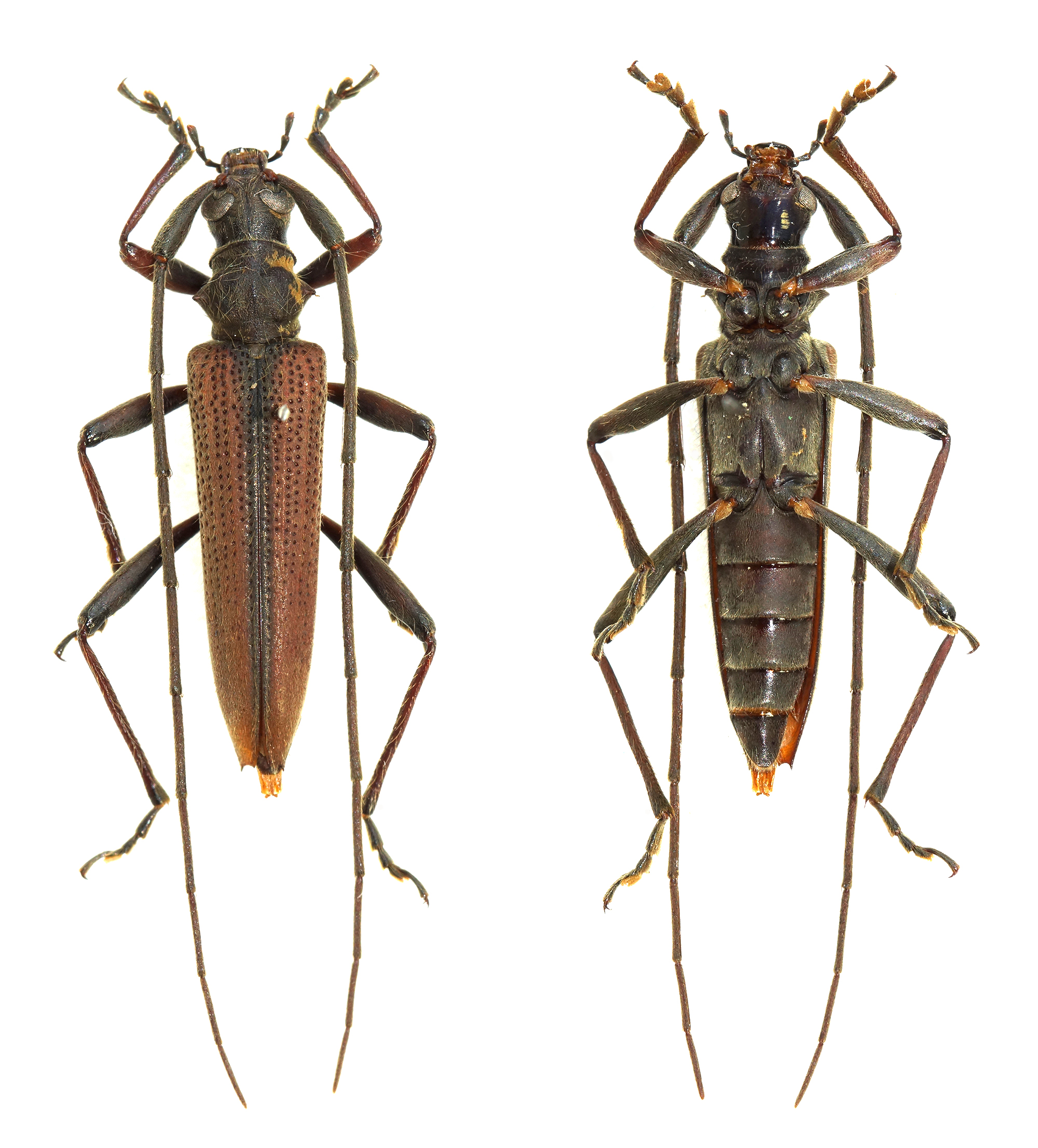

Scientific classification
- Kingdom: Animalia
- Phylum: Arthropoda
- Class: Insecta
- Order: Coleoptera
- Suborder: Polyphaga
- Infraorder: Cucujiformia
- Family: Disteniidae
- Genus: Distenia
- Species: D. dayak

Binomial name
- Distenia dayak Villiers, 1958

= Distenia dayak =

Species of beetle

Distenia dayak is a species of beetle of the family Disteniidae. This species is found on Borneo.
