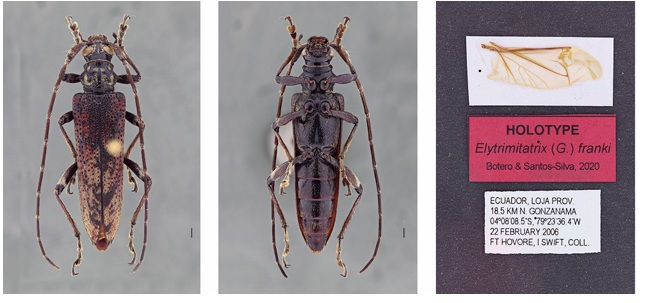

Scientific classification
- Kingdom: Animalia
- Phylum: Arthropoda
- Class: Insecta
- Order: Coleoptera
- Suborder: Polyphaga
- Infraorder: Cucujiformia
- Family: Disteniidae
- Genus: Elytrimitatrix
- Species: E. franki

Binomial name
- Elytrimitatrix franki Botero & Santos-Silva, 2020

= Elytrimitatrix franki =

Species of beetle

Elytrimitatrix franki is a species of beetle in the family Disteniidae. This species is found in Ecuador.
