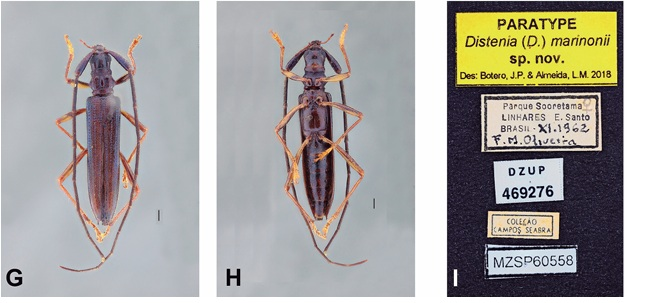

Scientific classification
- Kingdom: Animalia
- Phylum: Arthropoda
- Class: Insecta
- Order: Coleoptera
- Suborder: Polyphaga
- Infraorder: Cucujiformia
- Family: Disteniidae
- Genus: Distenia
- Species: D. marinonii

Binomial name
- Distenia marinonii Botero & Almeida, 2019

= Distenia marinonii =

Species of beetle

Distenia marinonii is a species of beetle of the Disteniidae family. This species is found in Brazil (Bahia, Espírito Santo).
