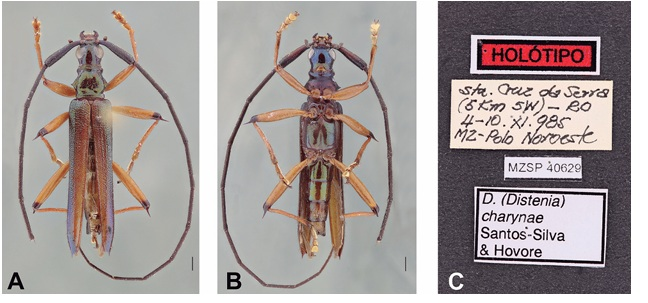

Scientific classification
- Kingdom: Animalia
- Phylum: Arthropoda
- Class: Insecta
- Order: Coleoptera
- Suborder: Polyphaga
- Infraorder: Cucujiformia
- Family: Disteniidae
- Genus: Distenia
- Species: D. charynae

Binomial name
- Distenia charynae Santos-Silva & Hovore, 2007

= Distenia charynae =

Species of beetle

Distenia charynae is a species of beetle of the Disteniidae family. This species is found in Bolivia and Brazil (Rondônia).
