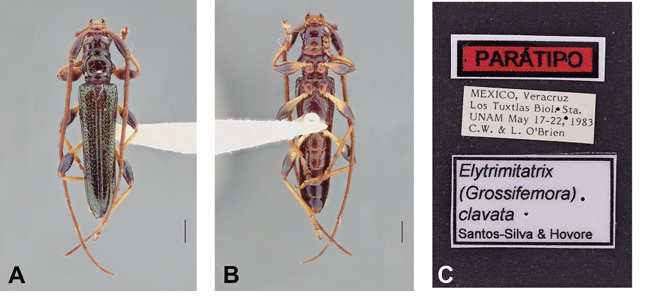

Scientific classification
- Kingdom: Animalia
- Phylum: Arthropoda
- Class: Insecta
- Order: Coleoptera
- Suborder: Polyphaga
- Infraorder: Cucujiformia
- Family: Disteniidae
- Genus: Elytrimitatrix
- Species: E. clavata

Binomial name
- Elytrimitatrix clavata Santos-Silva & Hovore, 2008

= Elytrimitatrix clavata =

Species of beetle

Elytrimitatrix clavata is a species of beetle of the Disteniidae family. This species is found in Mexico (Veracruz).
