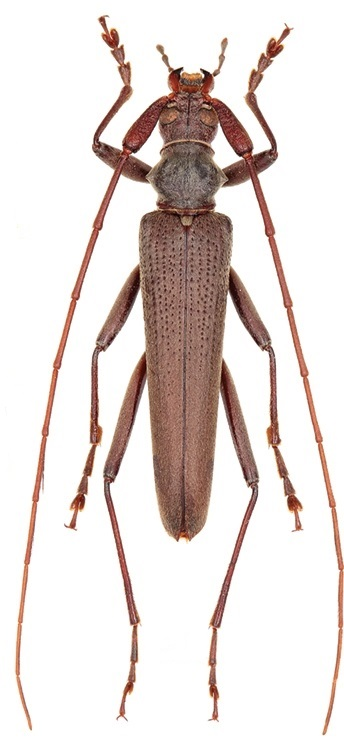
- Distenia gracilis (male)

Scientific classification
- Kingdom: Animalia
- Phylum: Arthropoda
- Clade: Pancrustacea
- Class: Insecta
- Order: Coleoptera
- Suborder: Polyphaga
- Infraorder: Cucujiformia
- Family: Disteniidae
- Tribe: Disteniini
- Genus: Distenia; Serville, 1825

= Distenia =

Genus of beetles

Distenia is a genus of disteniid beetle.

== Genomics ==
A chromosome-level genome assembly for Distenia gracilis was published in 2026, representing the first reference genome for the family Disteniidae. The assembled genome is approximately 1.89 Gb in size, with 97.1% of the assembly anchored to 10 chromosomes. The genome assembly has a BUSCO completeness of 99.27%, and 77,131 protein-coding genes were predicted, of which 33,643 were functionally annotated.

== Species ==
- Distenia agroides Bates, 1870
- Distenia ampliata Pu, 1985
- Distenia angustata Bates, 1870
- Distenia annulicornis Villiers, 1959
- Distenia bouganvilleana Schwarzer, 1923
- Distenia caerulescens Gounelle, 1911
- Distenia carinata Villiers, 1959
- Distenia chaparensis Tippmann, 1953
- Distenia charynae Santos-Silva & Hovore, 2007
- Distenia cinctipennis Gounelle, 1911
- Distenia columbina Lepeletier & Audinet-Serville, 1828
- Distenia cyaneipennis Villiers, 1959
- Distenia dayak Villiers, 1958
- Distenia dillonorum Lingafelter, 2007
- Distenia dissimilis Chiang & Wu, 1987
- Distenia dohertii Gahan, 1906
- Distenia dravidiana Gahan, 1906
- Distenia esmeralda Villiers, 1959
- Distenia fastuosa Pascoe, 1871
- Distenia femoralis (Boppe, 1921)
- Distenia forcipata Villiers, 1959
- Distenia formosana Mitono, 1936
- Distenia fossulata Villiers, 1959
- Distenia fulvipennis Gressit, 1935
- Distenia gracilis (Blessig, 1872)
- Distenia granulipes Villiers, 1959
- Distenia gressitti Lingafelter, 2007
- Distenia heterotarsalis Heller, 1923
- Distenia japonica Bates, 1873
- Distenia kalidasae (Lameere, 1890)
- Distenia langurioides Bates, 1885
- Distenia levitemporalis Heller, 1924
- Distenia limbata Bates, 1885
- Distenia macella Villiers, 1959
- Distenia marcelae Santos-Silva & Hovore, 2007
- Distenia marinonii Botero & Almeida, 2019
- Distenia mellina Holzschuh, 1995
- Distenia mermudesi Santos-Silva & Hovore, 2007
- Distenia metallica Villiers, 1958
- Distenia minor Gressitt, 1959
- Distenia nigrosparsa Pic, 1914
- Distenia notabilis Chiang & Wu, 1987
- Distenia orientalis Bi & Lin, 2013
- Distenia peninsularis Santos-Silva & Hovore, 2008
- Distenia perforans Holzschuh, 1995
- Distenia phaeocera Bates, 1880
- Distenia picea Chiang & Wu, 1987
- Distenia pici Villiers, 1958
- Distenia pilosa Villiers, 1959
- Distenia plumbea Holzschuh, 1993
- Distenia pryeri Pascoe, 1885
- Distenia punctulata Dillon & Dillon, 1952
- Distenia puctulatoides Hubweber, 2010
- Distenia rufipes Bates, 1870
- Distenia rufobrunnea Holzschuh, 1995
- Distenia rugiscapis Bates, 1885
- Distenia sallaei Bates, 1885
- Distenia samarensis Villiers, 1959
- Distenia semiflava Villiers, 1958
- Distenia shennongjiaensis Pu, 1985
- Distenia solangeae Santos-Silva & Hovore, 2007
- Distenia sparsepunctata Pic, 1928
- Distenia spinipennis Fisher, 1946
- Distenia splendens Bates, 1870
- Distenia stenola Chiang & Wu, 1987
- Distenia striaticollis Villiers, 1959
- Distenia sumatrensis Schwarzer, 1924
- Distenia suturalis Bates, 1870
- Distenia tavakiliani Santos-Silva & Hovore, 2007
- Distenia tonkinea Villiers, 1958
- Distenia tricostata Chiang & Wu, 1987
- Distenia tuberosa Pu, 1985
- Distenia turnbowi Santos-Silva & Hovore, 2007
- Distenia viridicyanea (Thomson, 1864)
- Distenia wolongensis Chiang & Wu, 1997
