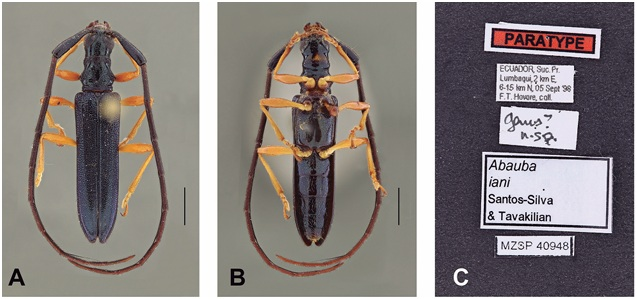

Scientific classification
- Kingdom: Animalia
- Phylum: Arthropoda
- Class: Insecta
- Order: Coleoptera
- Suborder: Polyphaga
- Infraorder: Cucujiformia
- Family: Disteniidae
- Genus: Abauba
- Species: A. iani

Binomial name
- Abauba iani Santos-Silva & Tavakilian, 2009

= Abauba iani =

Species of beetle

Abauba iani is a species of beetle in the family Disteniidae. This species is found in Ecuador.

== Etymology ==
The species is named in honour of Ian Swift.
