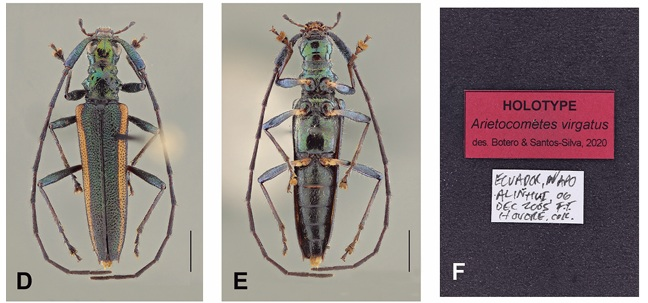

Scientific classification
- Kingdom: Animalia
- Phylum: Arthropoda
- Class: Insecta
- Order: Coleoptera
- Suborder: Polyphaga
- Infraorder: Cucujiformia
- Family: Disteniidae
- Genus: Arietocometes
- Species: A. virgatus

Binomial name
- Arietocometes virgatus Botero & Santos-Silva, 2021

= Arietocometes virgatus =

Species of beetle

Arietocometes virgatus is a species of beetle of the Disteniidae family. This species is found in Colombia and Ecuador.
