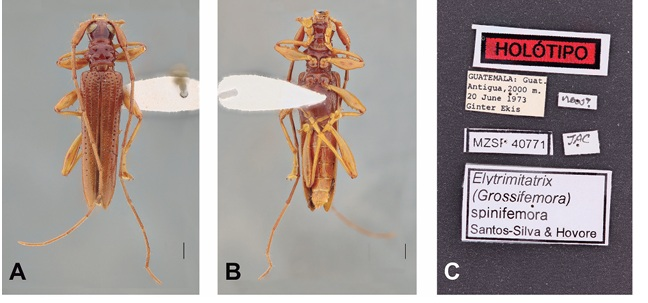

Scientific classification
- Kingdom: Animalia
- Phylum: Arthropoda
- Class: Insecta
- Order: Coleoptera
- Suborder: Polyphaga
- Infraorder: Cucujiformia
- Family: Disteniidae
- Genus: Elytrimitatrix
- Species: E. spinifemora

Binomial name
- Elytrimitatrix spinifemora Santos-Silva & Hovore, 2008

= Elytrimitatrix spinifemora =

Species of beetle

Elytrimitatrix spinifemora is a species of beetle in the family Disteniidae. This species is found in Guatemala.
