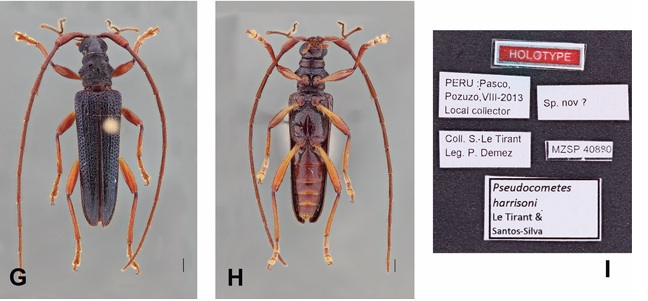

Scientific classification
- Kingdom: Animalia
- Phylum: Arthropoda
- Class: Insecta
- Order: Coleoptera
- Suborder: Polyphaga
- Infraorder: Cucujiformia
- Family: Disteniidae
- Genus: Pseudocometes
- Species: P. harrisoni

Binomial name
- Pseudocometes harrisoni Le Tirant & Santos-Silva, 2014

= Pseudocometes harrisoni =

Species of beetle

Pseudocometes harrisoni is a species of beetle of the Disteniidae family. This species is found in Peru.
