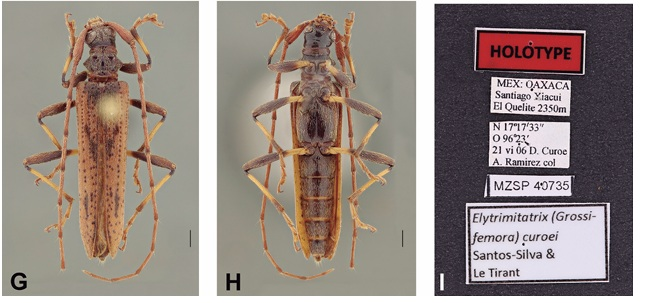

Scientific classification
- Kingdom: Animalia
- Phylum: Arthropoda
- Class: Insecta
- Order: Coleoptera
- Suborder: Polyphaga
- Infraorder: Cucujiformia
- Family: Disteniidae
- Genus: Elytrimitatrix
- Species: E. curoei

Binomial name
- Elytrimitatrix curoei Santos-Silva & Le Tirant, 2016

= Elytrimitatrix curoei =

Species of beetle

Elytrimitatrix curoei is a species of beetle of the Disteniidae family. This species is found in Mexico (Oaxaca).
