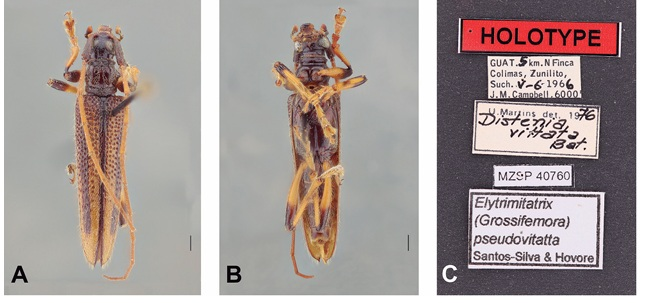

Scientific classification
- Kingdom: Animalia
- Phylum: Arthropoda
- Class: Insecta
- Order: Coleoptera
- Suborder: Polyphaga
- Infraorder: Cucujiformia
- Family: Disteniidae
- Genus: Elytrimitatrix
- Species: E. pseudovittata

Binomial name
- Elytrimitatrix pseudovittata Santos-Silva & Hovore, 2008

= Elytrimitatrix pseudovittata =

Species of beetle

Elytrimitatrix pseudovittata is a species of beetle in the family Disteniidae . This species is found in Guatemala.
