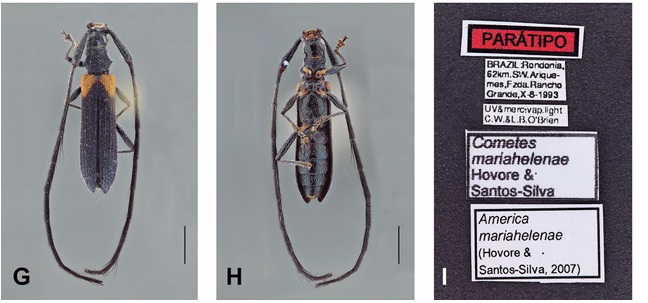

Scientific classification
- Kingdom: Animalia
- Phylum: Arthropoda
- Class: Insecta
- Order: Coleoptera
- Suborder: Polyphaga
- Infraorder: Cucujiformia
- Family: Disteniidae
- Genus: America
- Species: A. mariahelenae

Binomial name
- America mariahelenae (Hovore & Santos-Silva, 2007)

Synonyms
- Cometes mariahelenae Hovore & Santos-Silva, 2007

= America mariahelenae =

Species of beetle

America mariahelenae is a species of beetle of the Disteniidae family. This species is found in Brazil.
