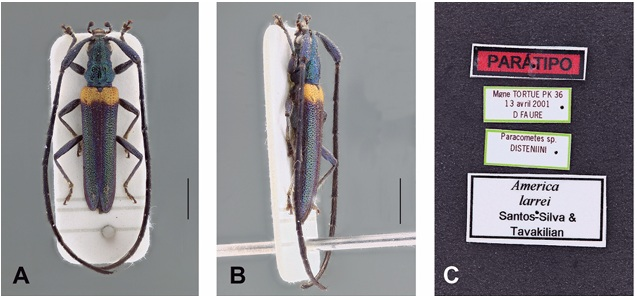

Scientific classification
- Kingdom: Animalia
- Phylum: Arthropoda
- Class: Insecta
- Order: Coleoptera
- Suborder: Polyphaga
- Infraorder: Cucujiformia
- Family: Disteniidae
- Genus: America
- Species: A. larrei

Binomial name
- America larrei Santos-Silva & Tavakilian, 2009

= America larrei =

Species of beetle

America larrei is a species of beetle in the family Disteniidae. This species is found in Guyana and French Guiana.
