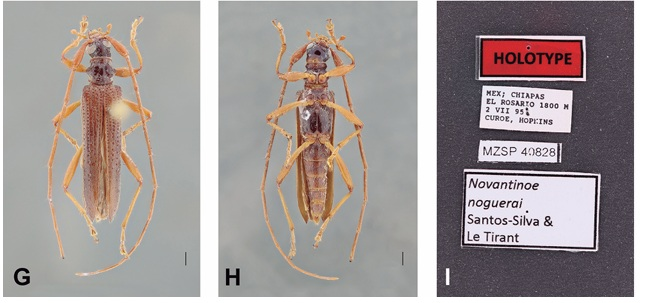

Scientific classification
- Kingdom: Animalia
- Phylum: Arthropoda
- Class: Insecta
- Order: Coleoptera
- Suborder: Polyphaga
- Infraorder: Cucujiformia
- Family: Disteniidae
- Genus: Novantinoe
- Species: N. noguerai

Binomial name
- Novantinoe noguerai Santos-Silva & Le Tirant, 2016

= Novantinoe noguerai =

Species of beetle

Novantinoe noguerai is a species of beetle in the family Disteniidae. This species is found in Mexico (Chiapas).
