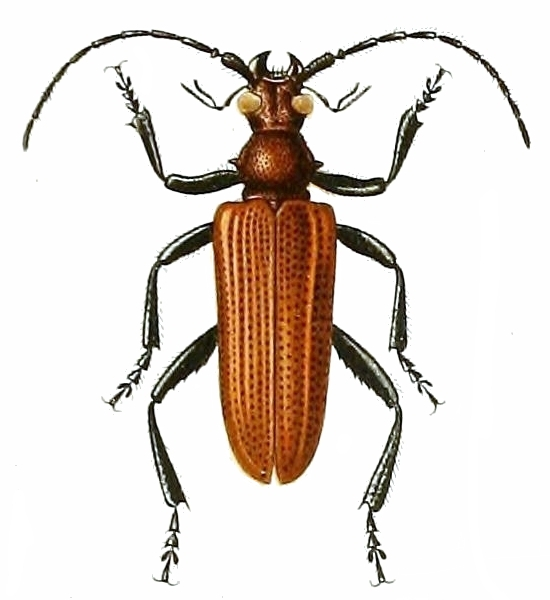

Scientific classification
- Kingdom: Animalia
- Phylum: Arthropoda
- Clade: Pancrustacea
- Class: Insecta
- Order: Coleoptera
- Suborder: Polyphaga
- Infraorder: Cucujiformia
- Family: Disteniidae
- Genus: Cyrtonops
- Species: C. punctipennis

Binomial name
- Cyrtonops punctipennis White, 1853

Synonyms
- Cladopalpus hageni Lansberge, 1886

= Cyrtonops punctipennis =

Species of beetle

Cyrtonops punctipennis is a species of beetle of the Disteniidae family. This species is found in India (Himalaya, Assam, Maharashtra), Nepal, Myanmar, Borneo, Java, Sumatra, Laos, China (Guangdong, Yunnan, Taiwan, possibly Tibet) and Taiwan.

Adults are cinnamon brown, with the head and prothorax darker.
