= Cyrtonops boh =

Scientific classification
- Kingdom: Animalia
- Phylum: Arthropoda
- Class: Insecta
- Order: Coleoptera
- Suborder: Polyphaga
- Infraorder: Cucujiformia
- Family: Disteniidae
- Genus: Cyrtonops
- Species: C. boh

Binomial name
- Cyrtonops boh Hergovits, 2022

Species of beetle

Cyrtonops boh is a species of beetle of the family Disteniidae. This species is found in western Malaysia.

The elytra are reddish-brown, while the rest of the body is dark reddish-brown.

== Etymology ==
The species name is derived from the village of Kampung Kuala Boh, where the author caught two specimens.
