= Hovorestenia =

Scientific classification
- Kingdom: Animalia
- Phylum: Arthropoda
- Class: Insecta
- Order: Coleoptera
- Suborder: Polyphaga
- Infraorder: Cucujiformia
- Family: Disteniidae
- Tribe: Disteniini
- Genus: Hovorestenia; Santos-Silva, 2007

Genus of beetles

Hovorestenia is a genus of disteniid beetles.

== Species ==
- Hovorestenia cleideae Botero, 2020
- Hovorestenia espilota Botero, 2020
- Hovorestenia humeralis (Waterhouse, 1880)
- Hovorestenia thalassina Santos-Silva & Hovore, 2008
