= Abauba =

Scientific classification
- Kingdom: Animalia
- Phylum: Arthropoda
- Class: Insecta
- Order: Coleoptera
- Suborder: Polyphaga
- Infraorder: Cucujiformia
- Family: Disteniidae
- Tribe: Disteniini
- Genus: Abauba; Santos-Silva & Tavakilian, 2009

Genus of beetles

Abauba is a genus of disteniid beetle.

== Species ==
- Abauba ericae (Martins & Galileo, 1994)
- Abauba flavipes (Villiers, 1958)
- Abauba iani Santos-Silva & Tavakilian, 2009
- Abauba mediorufovittata Santos-Silva & Tavakilian, 2009
- Abauba napoensis Santos-Silva & Tavakilian, 2009
