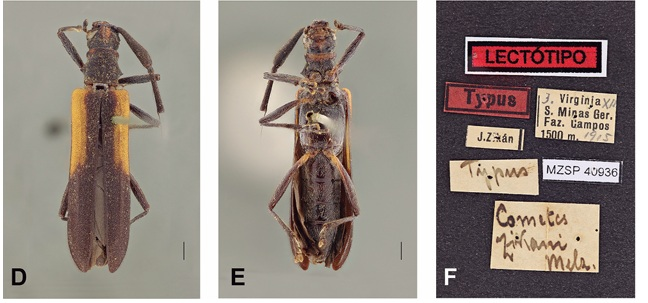

Scientific classification
- Kingdom: Animalia
- Phylum: Arthropoda
- Class: Insecta
- Order: Coleoptera
- Suborder: Polyphaga
- Infraorder: Cucujiformia
- Family: Disteniidae
- Genus: Cometes
- Species: C. zikani

Binomial name
- Cometes zikani Melzer, 1926

= Cometes zikani =

Species of beetle

Cometes zikani is a species of beetle of the Disteniidae family. This species is found in Brazil (Minas Gerais, Rio de Janeiro).
