= Dynamostini =

Scientific classification
- Kingdom: Animalia
- Phylum: Arthropoda
- Clade: Pancrustacea
- Class: Insecta
- Order: Coleoptera
- Suborder: Polyphaga
- Infraorder: Cucujiformia
- Family: Disteniidae
- Tribe: Dynamostini; Lacordaire, 1869

Tribe of beetles

Dynamostini is a tribe of Disteniid beetle.

== Genera ==
- Aiurasyma Martins & Galileo, 2001
- Dynamostes Pascoe, 1857
