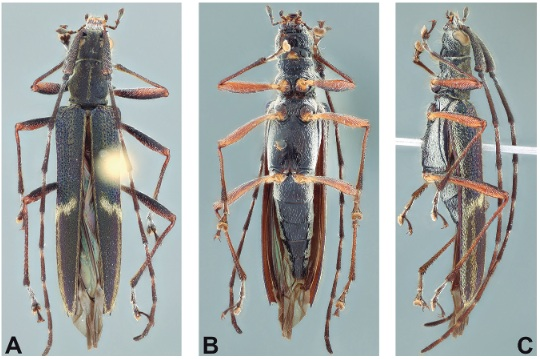

Scientific classification
- Kingdom: Animalia
- Phylum: Arthropoda
- Class: Insecta
- Order: Coleoptera
- Suborder: Polyphaga
- Infraorder: Cucujiformia
- Family: Disteniidae
- Genus: Hovorestenia
- Species: H. espilota

Binomial name
- Hovorestenia espilota Botero, 2020

= Hovorestenia espilota =

Species of beetle

Hovorestenia espilota is a species of beetle in the family Disteniidae. This species is found in Colombia.

Adults reach a length of about 12.4 mm. They are dark brown with metallic-blue reflections.

== Etymology ==
The name of the species is derived from Latin ex (meaning without) and Greek spilotos (meaning spotted) and refers to the absence of a spot of grayish pubescence on the elytra.
