= Heteropalpini =

Scientific classification
- Kingdom: Animalia
- Phylum: Arthropoda
- Clade: Pancrustacea
- Class: Insecta
- Order: Coleoptera
- Suborder: Polyphaga
- Infraorder: Cucujiformia
- Family: Disteniidae
- Tribe: Heteropalpini; Villiers, 1980

Tribe of beetles

Heteropalpini is a tribe of Disteniid beetle.

== Genera ==
- Heteropalpus Buquet, 1843
- Pseudocometes Villiers, 1958
- Tobipuranga Napp & Martins, 1996
