= Nethinius =

Scientific classification
- Kingdom: Animalia
- Phylum: Arthropoda
- Class: Insecta
- Order: Coleoptera
- Suborder: Polyphaga
- Infraorder: Cucujiformia
- Family: Disteniidae
- Tribe: Disteniini
- Genus: Nethinius; Fairmaire, 1889

Genus of beetles

Nethinius is a genus of disteniid beetles.

== Species ==
- Nethinius acuticollis Villiers, 1980
- Nethinius alluaudi Villiers, 1980
- Nethinius ambrinus Villiers, 1980
- Nethinius amethystinus Villiers, 1980
- Nethinius amicus Villiers, 1980
- Nethinius anticipes Fairmaire, 1896
- Nethinius atroviridis Villiers, 1980
- Nethinius ballerioi Vitali, 2007
- Nethinius berafiensis Villiers, 1980
- Nethinius bicoloritarsis Villiers, 1980
- Nethinius capreolus Villiers, 1980
- Nethinius catalai Villiers, 1980
- Nethinius coindardii Fairmaire, 1902
- Nethinius cribratus Villiers, 1980
- Nethinius curlettii Vitali, 2007
- Nethinius cylindricus Villiers, 1980
- Nethinius dimidiatipes Fairmaire, 1889
- Nethinius elegans Villiers, 1980
- Nethinius elongatus Villiers, 1980
- Nethinius ernesti Quentin & Villiers, 1979
- Nethinius fairmairei Villiers, 1980
- Nethinius flavipes Villiers, 1980
- Nethinius fulvescens Fairmaire, 1889
- Nethinius fulvipes Fairmaire, 1889
- Nethinius giganteus Villiers, 1980
- Nethinius gracilior Fairmaire, 1901
- Nethinius hirsutus Villiers, 1980
- Nethinius humbloti Quentin & Villiers, 1979
- Nethinius laevicollis Villiers, 1980
- Nethinius laticollis Villiers, 1980
- Nethinius longipennis Fairmaire, 1902
- Nethinius mananarensis Villiers, 1980
- Nethinius maroantsetrensis Villiers, 1980
- Nethinius montanus Villiers, 1980
- Nethinius nanus Villiers, 1980
- Nethinius nigricornis Villiers, 1980
- Nethinius nigripennis Villiers, 1980
- Nethinius obscuripes Fairmaire, 1889
- Nethinius occidentalis Villiers, 1980
- Nethinius pallidipes Künckel, 1890
- Nethinius pauliani Villiers, 1980
- Nethinius perinetensis Villiers, 1980
- Nethinius perrieri Fairmaire, 1899
- Nethinius perroti Villiers, 1980
- Nethinius peyrierasi Villiers, 1980
- Nethinius pilosus Villiers, 1980
- Nethinius punctatus Villiers, 1980
- Nethinius quadrinodosus Villiers, 1980
- Nethinius quentini Villiers, 1980
- Nethinius robinsoni Villiers, 1980
- Nethinius rossi Villiers, 1980
- Nethinius ruficeps Fairmaire, 1899
- Nethinius sambiranensis Villiers, 1980
- Nethinius sanguinicollis Fairmaire, 1889
- Nethinius satanas Villiers, 1980
- Nethinius semirufus Fairmaire, 1901
- Nethinius septentrionis Villiers, 1980
- Nethinius setigerus Villiers, 1980
- Nethinius seyrigi Villiers, 1980
- Nethinius sicardi Villiers, 1980
- Nethinius sogai Villiers, 1980
- Nethinius tenebrosus Villiers, 1980
- Nethinius testaceus Villiers, 1980
- Nethinius vadoni Villiers, 1980
- Nethinius vicinus Villiers, 1980
- Nethinius violaceipennis Villiers, 1980
- Nethinius wintreberti Villiers, 1980
- Nethinius wittmeri Villiers, 1980
