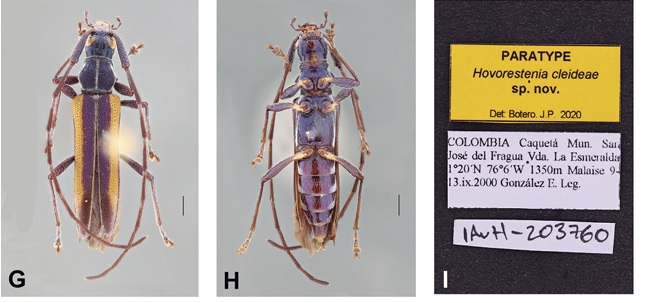

Scientific classification
- Kingdom: Animalia
- Phylum: Arthropoda
- Class: Insecta
- Order: Coleoptera
- Suborder: Polyphaga
- Infraorder: Cucujiformia
- Family: Disteniidae
- Genus: Hovorestenia
- Species: H. cleideae

Binomial name
- Hovorestenia cleideae Botero, 2020

= Hovorestenia cleideae =

Species of beetle

Hovorestenia cleideae is a species of beetle in the family Disteniidae. This species is found in Colombia and Ecuador.

== Description ==
Adults reach a length of about 10.5 mm. They are dark brown with metallic-blue reflections, while the head and pronotum are slightly greenish. Each elytron has an orange fascia, starting on the humerus and reaching about one-fourth of elytral length, gradually narrowing posteriorly.

== Etymology ==
This species is named in honor of Dr. Cleide Costa, for her contributions to the knowledge of the immatures of Coleoptera.
