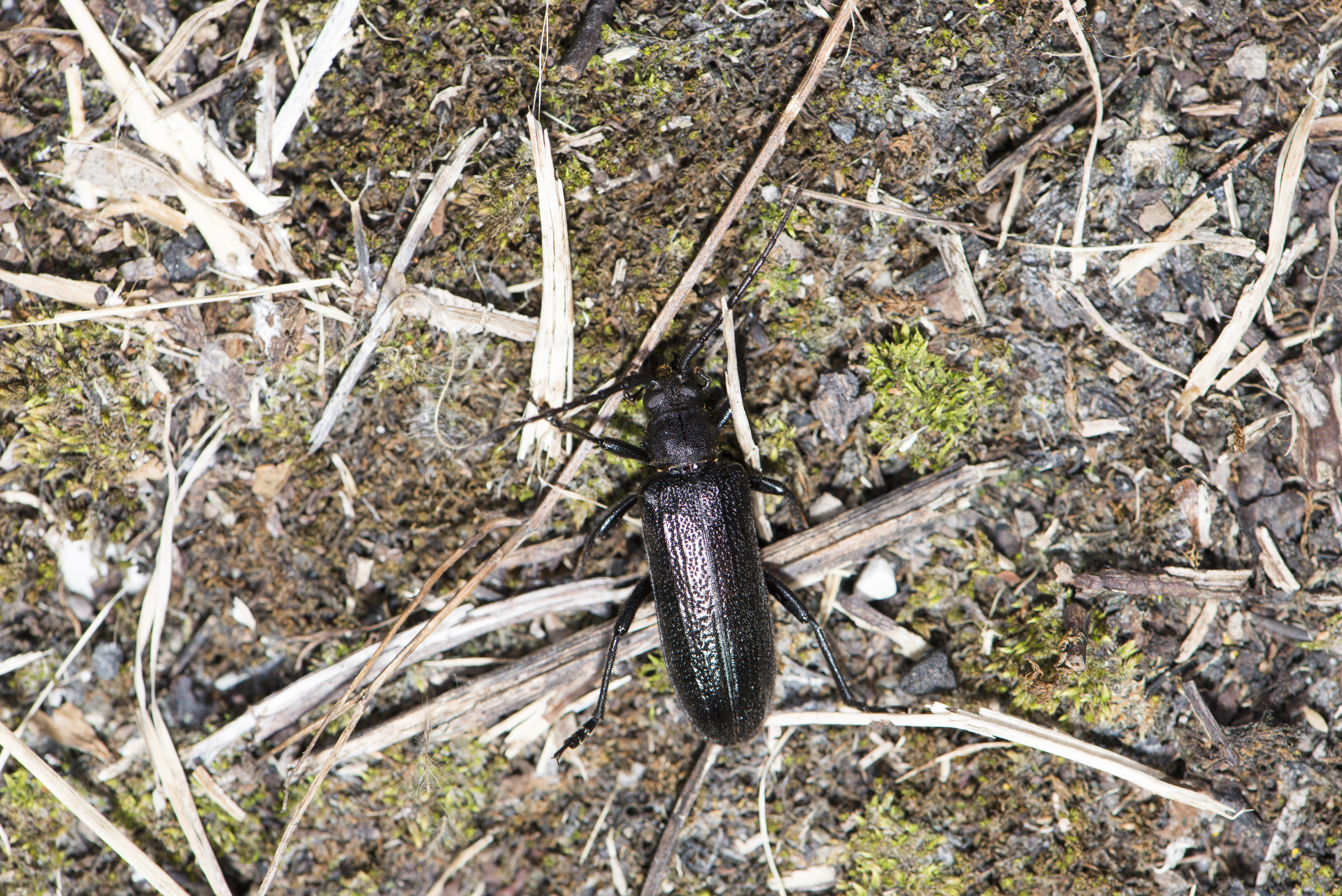
- Cyrtonops asahinai

Scientific classification
- Kingdom: Animalia
- Phylum: Arthropoda
- Class: Insecta
- Order: Coleoptera
- Suborder: Polyphaga
- Infraorder: Cucujiformia
- Family: Disteniidae
- Tribe: Cyrtonopini; White, 1853
- Genus: Cyrtonops; White, 1853

= Cyrtonops =

Genus of beetles

Cyrtonops is a genus of disteniid beetle. It is the only genus in the tribe Cyrtonopini.

== Species ==
- Cyrtonops asahinai Mitono, 1947
- Cyrtonops aterrimus Holzschuh, 1991
- Cyrtonops boh Hergovits, 2022
- Cyrtonops caliginosus Holzschuh, 2016
- Cyrtonops insularis Villiers, 1958
- Cyrtonops marginellus Holzschuh, 2016
- Cyrtonops metallicus Hüdepohl, 1990
- Cyrtonops niger Gahan, 1906
- Cyrtonops piceatus Holzschuh, 1991
- Cyrtonops punctipennis White, 1853
- Cyrtonops rufipennis Pic, 1922
- Cyrtonops simplicipes Holzschuh, 1991
- Cyrtonops strbai Hergovits, 2022
- Cyrtonops tonkineus Fairmaire, 1895
