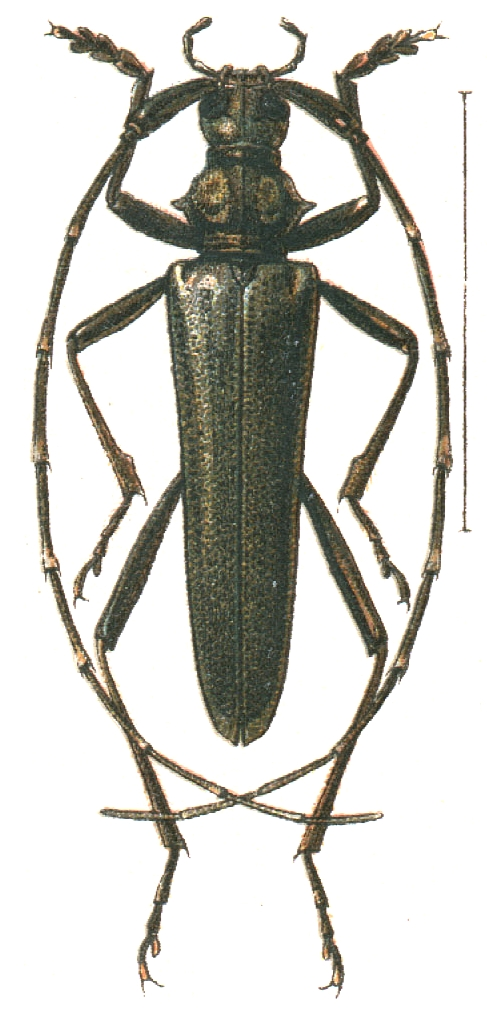
- Distenia gracilis Blessig, 1872

Scientific classification
- Kingdom: Animalia
- Phylum: Arthropoda
- Clade: Pancrustacea
- Class: Insecta
- Order: Coleoptera
- Suborder: Polyphaga
- Infraorder: Cucujiformia
- Superfamily: Chrysomeloidea
- Family: Disteniidae; Thomson, 1860

Tribes
- Cyrtonopini; Disteniini; Dynamostini; Heteropalpini

Diversity
- ca. 34 genera

= Disteniidae =

Family of beetles

The Disteniidae are a small family of beetles in the superfamily Chrysomeloidea, traditionally treated as a group within the Cerambycidae (most resembling certain Lepturinae such as the genus Stenocorus, but having long fine antennae and sometimes metallic colours).

== Morphology ==
=== Adult ===
The adults have a lepturoid aspect, having like those (except for a small number of cases) a divided stridulatory area. Nevertheless, the head is extremely short, the mandibles are strongly bowed and the anterior coxae are globular. The antennae are long, nearly filiform in most of the genera, and bearing very long setae in the Malagasy genus Nethinius.

=== Larva ===
The major differences are in the larval morphology, because they have the prosternal skin attached to the base of the submentum, rather than with the gula such as all other Cerambycidae. For nearly all other aspects, they are very similar to the larvae of Lepturinae.

== Distribution ==
This family, original from Gondwana, includes more than 300 species, widespread in all regions of the Southern Hemisphere, while much less common in the Northern Hemisphere. In particular, only a few species occur in North America and none are present in Europe. In contrast, Madagascar is extremely rich in species, especially of the endemic genus Nethinius.

== Biology ==
The adults have mostly nocturnal behaviour; some species (Nethinius) may be collected beating plants where they live. The fact that several specimens have been collected with mutilated legs and antennae suggests the existence of an aggressive character and of infra-specific fights for females. The larvae are xylophagous and attack wood or roots of broad-leaf trees.

== Systematics ==
The Disteniidae were inserted in "Cerambycides" by Jean Théodore Lacordaire, when the group included all cerambycids known at that time except for Lamiinae and Prioninae. LeConte & Horn (1883) included them in the Lepturinae, even noticing their peculiar primitivism. Gahan considered them as a subfamily suggesting that this group should deserve the elevation to family rank. This statement was formalised by Linsley in 1961, accepted by many subsequent authors and only seldom contested.

The family is composed of 4 tribes: (Note: Subfamilies are not used in the classification of Disteniidae.)

- Cyrtonopini White, 1853
- Disteniini Thomson, 1860
- Dynamostini Lacordaire, 1869
- Heteropalpini Villiers, 1980
