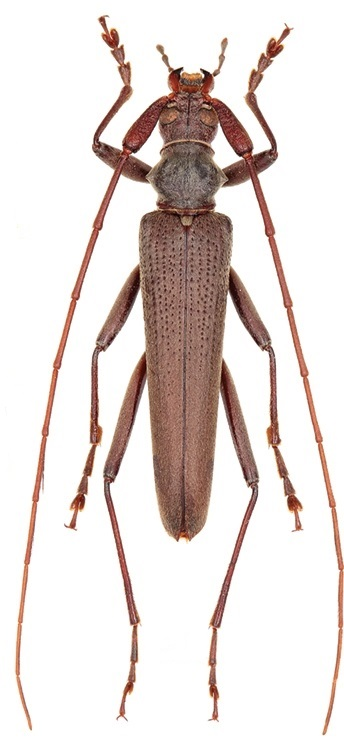
- Distenia gracilis (male)

Scientific classification
- Kingdom: Animalia
- Phylum: Arthropoda
- Clade: Pancrustacea
- Class: Insecta
- Order: Coleoptera
- Suborder: Polyphaga
- Infraorder: Cucujiformia
- Family: Disteniidae
- Tribe: Disteniini; Thomson, 1860

= Disteniini =

Tribe of beetles

Disteniini is a tribe of Disteniid beetle.

== Genera ==
- Abauba Santos-Silva & Tavakilian, 2009
- America Santos-Silva & Tavakilian, 2009
- Apharsatus Fairmaire, 1893
- Arietocometes Santos-Silva & Tavakilian, 2009
- Capnethinius Adlbauer, 2006
- Clytomelegena Pic, 1928
- Cometes Lepeletier & Audinet-Serville in Latreille, 1828
- Cupecuara Santos-Silva & Tavakilian, 2009
- Distenia Lepeletier & Audinet-Serville in Latreille, 1828
- Disteniazteca Hovore & Santos-Silva, 2007
- Elytrimitatrix Hovore & Santos-Silva, 2007
- Hovorestenia Santos-Silva, 2007
- Melegena Pascoe, 1869
- Micronoemia Aurivillius, 1922
- Myopsocometes Santos-Silva & Tavakilian, 2009
- Nericonia Pascoe, 1869
- Nethinius Fairmaire, 1889
- Noemia Pascoe, 1857
- Novantinoe Hovore & Santos-Silva, 2007
- Nupseranodes Adlbauer, 2006
- Oculipetilus Hovore & Santos-Silva, 2007
- Olemehlia Holzschuh, 2011
- Paracometes Villiers, 1957
- Phelocalocera Thomson, 1857
- Phelocalocerella Villiers, 1957
- Philippistenia Botero & Vives, 2021
- Saphanodes Hintz, 1913
- Tengius Matsushita, 1938
- Thaigena Holzschuh, 2011
- Typodryas Thomson, 1864
- Villiersicometes Santos-Silva, 2003
