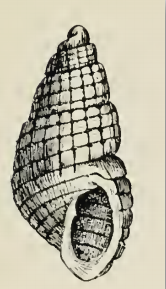
- Apertural view of the shell of Odostomia pulchra

Scientific classification
- Kingdom: Animalia
- Phylum: Mollusca
- Class: Gastropoda
- Family: Pyramidellidae
- Genus: Odostomia
- Species: O. pulchra

Binomial name
- Odostomia pulchra (de Folin, 1872)

Synonyms
- Chrysallida pulchra (de Folin, 1872); Noemia pulchra de Folin, 1872 (basionym); Odostomia (Chrysallida) pulchra ( de Folin, 1872)

= Odostomia pulchra =

Species of gastropod

Odostomia pulchra is a species of sea snail, a marine gastropod mollusc in the family Pyramidellidae, the pyrams and their allies.

== Description ==
The white shell is ovate, conic, subvitreous, and shining. It measures 2.2 mm. The 1½ whorls of the protoconch are obliquely immersed in the first of the succeeding turns. The 4½ whorls of the teleoconch are well rounded. They are marked by four spiral cords between the sutures and equally strong axial ribs, of which 14 occur upon the second, 16 upon the third, and 18 upon the penultimate turn. The sutures are well impressed. The periphery of the body whorl is marked by a slender channel. The base of the shell is well rounded. It is marked by four subequal, broad, rounded keels, the spaces between which are marked by slender riblets. The aperture is almost pear-shaped. The posterior angle is obtuse. The outer lip thin, showing the external sculpture within. The columella is slender, strongly curved, decidedly reflected, and provided with a weak fold at its insertion.

== Distribution ==
This species occurs in the Pacific Ocean off Margarita Island, Bay of Panama.
