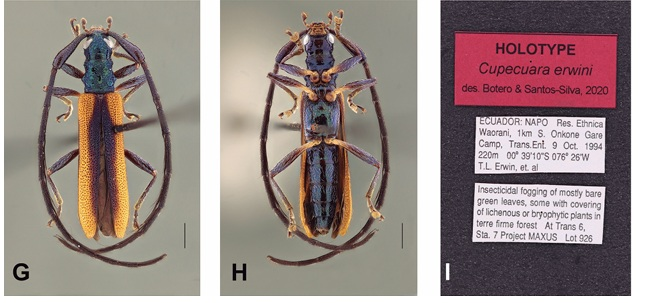

Scientific classification
- Kingdom: Animalia
- Phylum: Arthropoda
- Class: Insecta
- Order: Coleoptera
- Suborder: Polyphaga
- Infraorder: Cucujiformia
- Family: Disteniidae
- Genus: Cupecuara
- Species: C. erwini

Binomial name
- Cupecuara erwini Botero & Santos-Silva, 2020

= Cupecuara erwini =

Species of beetle

Cupecuara erwini is a species of beetle of the Disteniidae family. This species is found in Ecuador.
