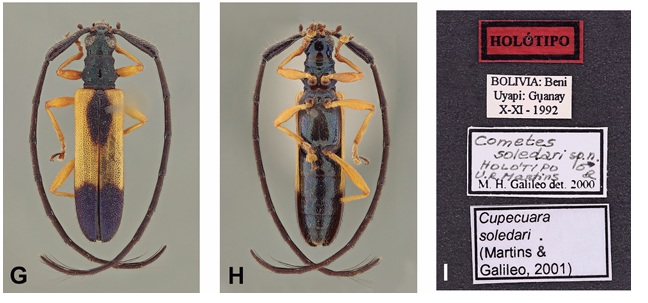

Scientific classification
- Kingdom: Animalia
- Phylum: Arthropoda
- Class: Insecta
- Order: Coleoptera
- Suborder: Polyphaga
- Infraorder: Cucujiformia
- Family: Disteniidae
- Genus: Cupecuara
- Species: C. soledari

Binomial name
- Cupecuara soledari (Martins & Galileo, 2001)

Synonyms
- Cometes soledari Martins & Galileo, 2001

= Cupecuara soledari =

Species of beetle

Cupecuara soledari is a species of beetle of the Disteniidae family. This species is found in Bolivia.
