= Micronoemia =

Scientific classification
- Kingdom: Animalia
- Phylum: Arthropoda
- Class: Insecta
- Order: Coleoptera
- Suborder: Polyphaga
- Infraorder: Cucujiformia
- Family: Disteniidae
- Tribe: Disteniini
- Genus: Micronoemia; Aurivillius, 1922

Genus of beetles

Micronoemia is a genus of disteniid beetles.

== Species ==
- Micronoemia albosignata Aurivillius, 1922
- Micronoemia bifasciata Aurivillius, 1922
- Micronoemia gerlachi Vives, 2007
- Micronoemia glauca Aurivillius, 1922
