= Paracometes =

Scientific classification
- Kingdom: Animalia
- Phylum: Arthropoda
- Class: Insecta
- Order: Coleoptera
- Suborder: Polyphaga
- Infraorder: Cucujiformia
- Family: Disteniidae
- Tribe: Disteniini
- Genus: Paracometes; Villiers, 1958

Genus of beetles

Paracometes is a genus of disteniid beetles.

== Species ==
- Paracometes acutipennis (Buquet, 1851)
- Paracometes birai (Hovore & Santos-Silva, 2007)
- Paracometes eximius (Bates, 1885)
- Paracometes mathani Villiers, 1958
- Paracometes micans Santos-Silva & Tavakilian, 2009
- Paracometes raberi Heffern & Santos-Silva, 2016
- Paracometes solangeae Botero & Almeida, 2019
- Paracometes venustus (Bates, 1885)
- Paracometes viridis Botero & Gutiérrez, 2020
