= Oculipetilus =

Scientific classification
- Kingdom: Animalia
- Phylum: Arthropoda
- Class: Insecta
- Order: Coleoptera
- Suborder: Polyphaga
- Infraorder: Cucujiformia
- Family: Disteniidae
- Tribe: Disteniini
- Genus: Oculipetilus; Santos-Silva & Hovore, 2007

Genus of beetles

Oculipetilus is a genus of disteniid beetles.

== Species ==
- Oculipetilus brunneorufus (Thomson, 1861)
- Oculipetilus pulcher (Melzer, 1926)
