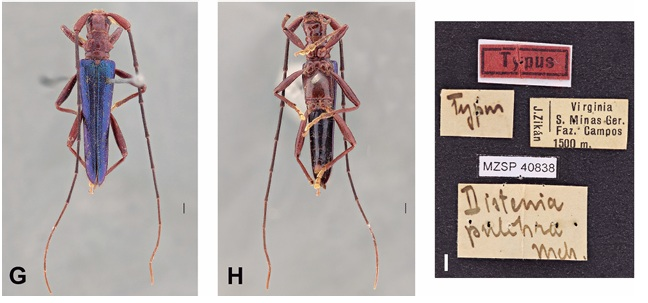

Scientific classification
- Kingdom: Animalia
- Phylum: Arthropoda
- Class: Insecta
- Order: Coleoptera
- Suborder: Polyphaga
- Infraorder: Cucujiformia
- Family: Disteniidae
- Genus: Oculipetilus
- Species: O. pulcher

Binomial name
- Oculipetilus pulcher (Melzer, 1926)

Synonyms
- Distenia pulchra Melzer, 1926; Distenia mirabilis Villiers, 1959; Oculipetilus pulchra

= Oculipetilus pulcher =

Species of beetle

Oculipetilus pulcher is a species of beetle of the Disteniidae family. This species is found in Brazil.
