= Villiersicometes =

Scientific classification
- Kingdom: Animalia
- Phylum: Arthropoda
- Class: Insecta
- Order: Coleoptera
- Suborder: Polyphaga
- Infraorder: Cucujiformia
- Family: Disteniidae
- Tribe: Disteniini
- Genus: Villiersicometes; Santos-Silva, 2003

Genus of beetles

Villiersicometes is a genus of disteniid beetles.

== Species ==
- Villiersicometes absalom Tavakilian & Santos-Silva, 2012
- Villiersicometes bijubatus (Gounelle, 1911)
- Villiersicometes galileoae Botero & Almeida, 2019
- Villiersicometes lineatus (Villiers, 1958)
- Villiersicometes scellierae Dalens, 2013
- Villiersicometes wagneri (Gounelle, 1911)
