= Phelocalocera =

Scientific classification
- Kingdom: Animalia
- Phylum: Arthropoda
- Class: Insecta
- Order: Coleoptera
- Suborder: Polyphaga
- Infraorder: Cucujiformia
- Family: Disteniidae
- Tribe: Disteniini
- Genus: Phelocalocera; Thomson, 1857

Genus of beetles

Phelocalocera is a genus of disteniid beetles.

== Species ==
- Phelocalocera peregrina (Thomson, 1857)
- Phelocalocera queketti (Distant, 1906)
