= Melegena viktorai =

Scientific classification
- Kingdom: Animalia
- Phylum: Arthropoda
- Class: Insecta
- Order: Coleoptera
- Suborder: Polyphaga
- Infraorder: Cucujiformia
- Family: Disteniidae
- Genus: Melegena
- Species: M. viktorai

Binomial name
- Melegena viktorai Hergovits, 2022

Species of beetle

Melegena viktorai is a species of beetle in the family Disteniidae. This species is found in western Malaysia.

The body is metallic blue, while the head, pronotum, scutellum and elytra are metallic blue green.

== Etymology ==
The species name is derived from the name of Petr Viktora, an expert on the family Cerambycidae.
