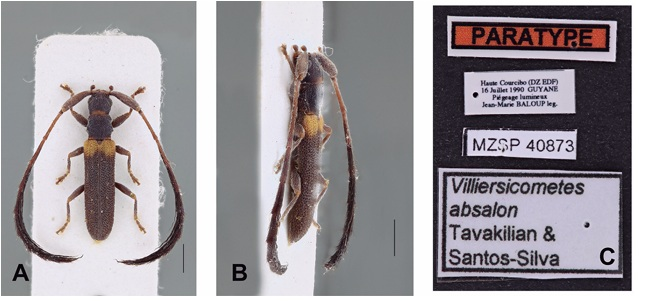

Scientific classification
- Kingdom: Animalia
- Phylum: Arthropoda
- Class: Insecta
- Order: Coleoptera
- Suborder: Polyphaga
- Infraorder: Cucujiformia
- Family: Disteniidae
- Genus: Villiersicometes
- Species: V. absalom

Binomial name
- Villiersicometes absalom Tavakilian & Santos-Silva, 2012

= Villiersicometes absalom =

Species of beetle

Villiersicometes absalom is a species of beetle in the family Disteniidae, known from French Guiana and Guyana.
