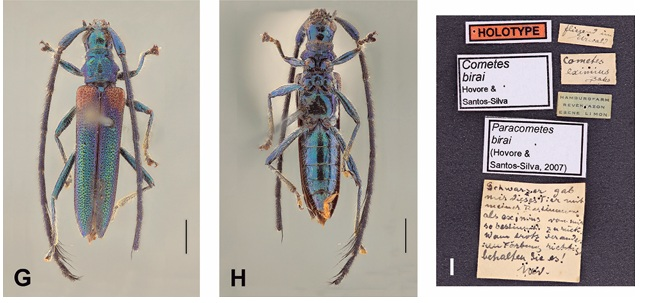

Scientific classification
- Kingdom: Animalia
- Phylum: Arthropoda
- Class: Insecta
- Order: Coleoptera
- Suborder: Polyphaga
- Infraorder: Cucujiformia
- Family: Disteniidae
- Genus: Paracometes
- Species: P. birai

Binomial name
- Paracometes birai (Hovore & Santos-Silva, 2007)

Synonyms
- Cometes birai Hovore & Santos-Silva, 2007

= Paracometes birai =

Species of beetle

Paracometes birai is a species of beetle of the Disteniidae family. This species is found in Costa Rica.
