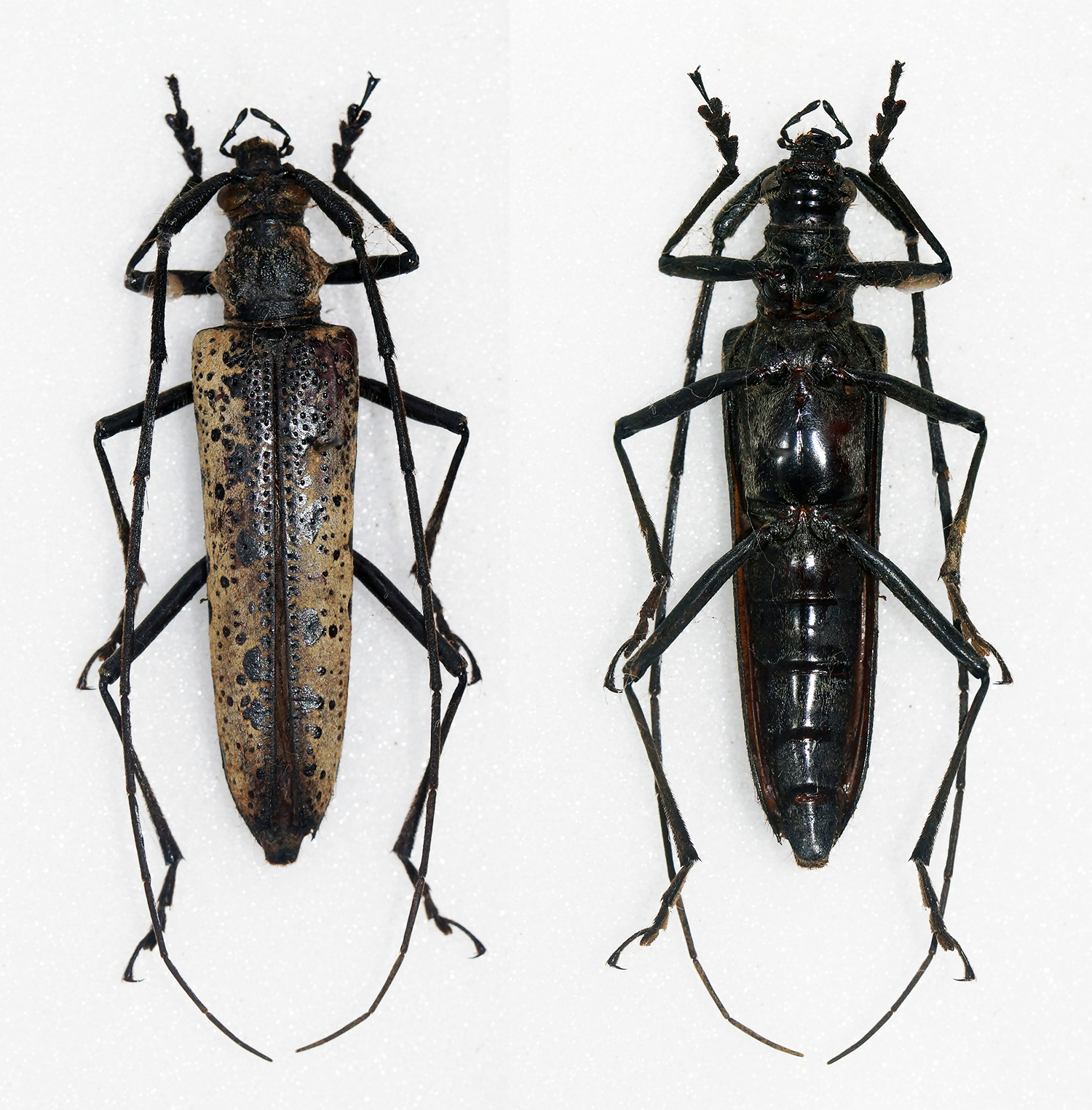
- Disteniazteca pilati

Scientific classification
- Kingdom: Animalia
- Phylum: Arthropoda
- Class: Insecta
- Order: Coleoptera
- Suborder: Polyphaga
- Infraorder: Cucujiformia
- Family: Disteniidae
- Tribe: Disteniini
- Genus: Disteniazteca; Santos-Silva & Hovore, 2007

= Disteniazteca =

Genus of beetles

Disteniazteca is a genus of disteniid beetles.

== Species ==
- Disteniazteca fimbriata (Lacordaire, 1869)
- Disteniazteca pilati (Chevrolat, 1857)
