= Nericonia continentalis =

Scientific classification
- Kingdom: Animalia
- Phylum: Arthropoda
- Class: Insecta
- Order: Coleoptera
- Suborder: Polyphaga
- Infraorder: Cucujiformia
- Family: Disteniidae
- Genus: Nericonia
- Species: N. continentalis

Binomial name
- Nericonia continentalis Hergovits, 2022

Species of beetle

Nericonia continentalis is a species of beetle in the family Disteniidae. This species is found in western Malaysia.

The body, head, pronotum, scutellum and elytra are black, while the antennae are a combination of brown and ochre yellow.

== Etymology ==
The species name is derived from the Asian continent. Related species are known only from the islands of Borneo and Tioman.
