= Myopsocometes =

Scientific classification
- Kingdom: Animalia
- Phylum: Arthropoda
- Class: Insecta
- Order: Coleoptera
- Suborder: Polyphaga
- Infraorder: Cucujiformia
- Family: Disteniidae
- Tribe: Disteniini
- Genus: Myopsocometes; Santos-Silva & Tavakilian, 2009

Genus of beetles

Myopsocometes is a genus of disteniid beetles.

== Species ==
- Myopsocometes humeralis (Villiers, 1958)
- Myopsocometes pseudohumeralis Santos-Silva & Tavakilian, 2009
