= Apharsatus =

Scientific classification
- Kingdom: Animalia
- Phylum: Arthropoda
- Class: Insecta
- Order: Coleoptera
- Suborder: Polyphaga
- Infraorder: Cucujiformia
- Family: Disteniidae
- Tribe: Disteniini
- Genus: Apharsatus; Fairmaire, 1893

Genus of beetles

Apharsatus is a genus of disteniid beetles.

== Species ==
- Apharsatus fallaciosus Fairmaire, 1893
- Apharsatus multicostatus Fairmaire, 1901
