= Typodryas =

Scientific classification
- Kingdom: Animalia
- Phylum: Arthropoda
- Class: Insecta
- Order: Coleoptera
- Suborder: Polyphaga
- Infraorder: Cucujiformia
- Family: Disteniidae
- Tribe: Disteniini
- Genus: Typodryas; Thomson, 1864

Genus of beetles

Typodryas is a genus of disteniid beetles.

== Species ==
- Typodryas brunnicollis Chiang & Wu, 1987
- Typodryas callichromoides Thomson, 1864
- Typodryas cambodiana Villiers, 1958
- Typodryas chalybeata (Pascoe, 1866)
- Typodryas kurosawai Hayashi, 1986
- Typodryas trochanterius Gahan, 1906
- Typodryas unidentata Villiers, 1958
