= Clytomelegena =

Scientific classification
- Kingdom: Animalia
- Phylum: Arthropoda
- Class: Insecta
- Order: Coleoptera
- Suborder: Polyphaga
- Infraorder: Cucujiformia
- Family: Disteniidae
- Tribe: Disteniini
- Genus: Clytomelegena; Pic, 1928

Genus of beetles

Clytomelegena is a genus of disteniid beetle.

== Species ==
- Clytomelegena kabakovi (Murzin, 1988)
- Clytomelegena postaurata Pic, 1928
