= Philippistenia =

Scientific classification
- Kingdom: Animalia
- Phylum: Arthropoda
- Class: Insecta
- Order: Coleoptera
- Suborder: Polyphaga
- Infraorder: Cucujiformia
- Family: Disteniidae
- Tribe: Disteniini
- Genus: Philippistenia; Botero & Vives, 2021

Genus of beetles

Philippistenia is a genus of disteniid beetle.

== Species ==
- Philippistenia halconensis (Vives, 2012)
- Philippistenia heterotarsalis (Heller, 1923)
- Philippistenia levitemporalis (Heller, 1924)
