= Saphanodes =

Scientific classification
- Kingdom: Animalia
- Phylum: Arthropoda
- Class: Insecta
- Order: Coleoptera
- Suborder: Polyphaga
- Infraorder: Cucujiformia
- Family: Disteniidae
- Tribe: Disteniini
- Genus: Saphanodes; Hintz, 1913

Genus of beetles

Saphanodes is a genus of disteniid beetles.

== Species ==
- Saphanodes allardi Villiers, 1969
- Saphanodes apicalis (Chevrolat, 1855)
- Saphanodes barclayi Adlbauer, 2016
- Saphanodes decellei Fuchs, 1969
- Saphanodes foveolatus Adlbauer, 2010
- Saphanodes gabonicus (Boppe, 1921)
- Saphanodes ivorensis (Lepesme, 1948)
- Saphanodes juheli Adlbauer, 2007
- Saphanodes lepesmei Villiers, 1969
- Saphanodes lujae Hintz, 1913
- Saphanodes mertensi (Lepesme, 1948)
- Saphanodes mocambicus Adlbauer, 2019
- Saphanodes obscurus Adlbauer, 2016
- Saphanodes orientalis (Villiers, 1958)
- Saphanodes puchneri Adlbauer, 2020
