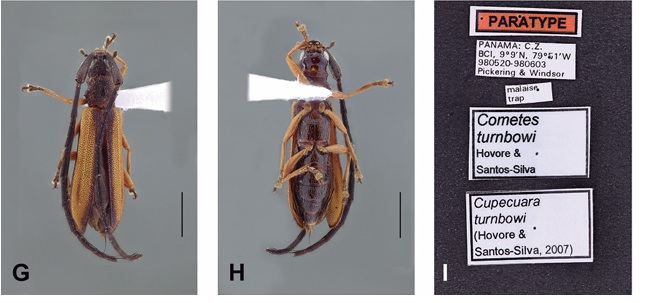

Scientific classification
- Kingdom: Animalia
- Phylum: Arthropoda
- Class: Insecta
- Order: Coleoptera
- Suborder: Polyphaga
- Infraorder: Cucujiformia
- Family: Disteniidae
- Genus: Cupecuara
- Species: C. turnbowi

Binomial name
- Cupecuara turnbowi (Hovore & Santos-Silva, 2007)

Synonyms
- Cometes turnbowi Hovore & Santos-Silva, 2007

= Cupecuara turnbowi =

Species of beetle

Cupecuara turnbowi is a species of beetle of the Disteniidae family. This species is found in Panama.
