= Melegena =

Scientific classification
- Kingdom: Animalia
- Phylum: Arthropoda
- Class: Insecta
- Order: Coleoptera
- Suborder: Polyphaga
- Infraorder: Cucujiformia
- Family: Disteniidae
- Tribe: Disteniini
- Genus: Melegena; Pascoe, 1869

Genus of beetles

Melegena is a genus of disteniid beetles.

== Species ==
- Melegena cyanea Pascoe, 1871
- Melegena diversa Holzschuh, 2014
- Melegena diversipes Pic, 1933
- Melegena emarginata Holzschuh, 1993
- Melegena flavipes Gahan, 1906
- Melegena fulva Pu, 1990
- Melegena gerhardti Hergovits, 2022
- Melegena pubipennis Pascoe, 1869
- Melegena viktorai Hergovits, 2022
