= Nericonia sabahensis =

Scientific classification
- Kingdom: Animalia
- Phylum: Arthropoda
- Class: Insecta
- Order: Coleoptera
- Suborder: Polyphaga
- Infraorder: Cucujiformia
- Family: Disteniidae
- Genus: Nericonia
- Species: N. sabahensis

Binomial name
- Nericonia sabahensis Hergovits, 2022

Species of beetle

Nericonia sabahensis is a species of beetle in the family Disteniidae. This species is found in Sabah, Malaysia (Borneo).

The body, head, pronotum, scutellum and elytra are black, while the antennae are a combination of brown and ochre yellow.

== Etymology ==
The species name is derived from the name of the Malayan state of Sabah on the island of Borneo, where the species is found.
