= Cupecuara =

Scientific classification
- Kingdom: Animalia
- Phylum: Arthropoda
- Class: Insecta
- Order: Coleoptera
- Suborder: Polyphaga
- Infraorder: Cucujiformia
- Family: Disteniidae
- Tribe: Disteniini
- Genus: Cupecuara; Santos-Silva & Tavakilian, 2009

Genus of beetles

Cupecuara is a genus of disteniid beetle.

== Species ==
- Cupecuara argodi (Belon, 1896)
- Cupecuara erwini Botero & Santos-Silva, 2020
- Cupecuara pojuca (Martins & Galileo, 2001)
- Cupecuara santossilvai Audureau, 2014
- Cupecuara soledari (Martins & Galileo, 2001)
- Cupecuara turnbowi (Hovore & Santos-Silva, 2007)
