= Capnethinius =

Scientific classification
- Kingdom: Animalia
- Phylum: Arthropoda
- Class: Insecta
- Order: Coleoptera
- Suborder: Polyphaga
- Infraorder: Cucujiformia
- Family: Disteniidae
- Tribe: Disteniini
- Genus: Capnethinius; Adlbauer, 2006

Genus of beetles

Capnethinius is a genus of disteniid beetles.

== Species ==
- Capnethinius semipunctatus Adlbauer, 2006
