= Nericonia =

Scientific classification
- Kingdom: Animalia
- Phylum: Arthropoda
- Class: Insecta
- Order: Coleoptera
- Suborder: Polyphaga
- Infraorder: Cucujiformia
- Family: Disteniidae
- Tribe: Disteniini
- Genus: Nericonia; Pascoe, 1869

Genus of beetles

Nericonia is a genus of disteniid beetles.

== Species ==
- Nericonia albopicta Holzschuh, 2014
- Nericonia boteroi Vives, 2024
- Nericonia continentalis Hergovits, 2022
- Nericonia fuscicornis Aurivillius, 1927
- Nericonia glabricollis Heller, 1915
- Nericonia halconensis Vives, 2015
- Nericonia luzonensis Vives, 2012
- Nericonia mindoroensis Villiers, 1959
- Nericonia nigra Gahan, 1894
- Nericonia opacella Aurivillius, 1927
- Nericonia panayensis Vives, 2022
- Nericonia sabahensis Hergovits, 2022
- Nericonia trifasciata Pascoe, 1869
- Nericonia x-litterata Heller, 1924
