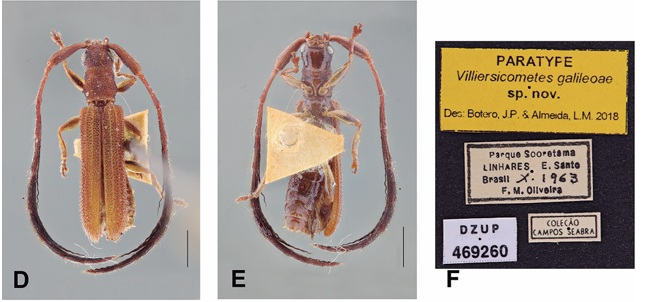

Scientific classification
- Kingdom: Animalia
- Phylum: Arthropoda
- Class: Insecta
- Order: Coleoptera
- Suborder: Polyphaga
- Infraorder: Cucujiformia
- Family: Disteniidae
- Genus: Villiersicometes
- Species: V. galileoae

Binomial name
- Villiersicometes galileoae Botero & Almeida, 2019

= Villiersicometes galileoae =

Species of beetle

Villiersicometes galileoae is a species of beetle in the family Disteniidae, known from Espírito Santo, Brazil.
