= Thaigena =

Scientific classification
- Kingdom: Animalia
- Phylum: Arthropoda
- Class: Insecta
- Order: Coleoptera
- Suborder: Polyphaga
- Infraorder: Cucujiformia
- Family: Disteniidae
- Genus: Thaigena; Holzschuh, 2011
- Species: T. obscurella

Binomial name
- Thaigena obscurella Holzschuh, 2011

Genus of beetles

Thaigena is a genus of disteniid beetles. It is monotypic, being represented by the single species Thaigena obscurella.
