= Phelocalocerella =

Scientific classification
- Kingdom: Animalia
- Phylum: Arthropoda
- Class: Insecta
- Order: Coleoptera
- Suborder: Polyphaga
- Infraorder: Cucujiformia
- Family: Disteniidae
- Genus: Phelocalocerella; Villiers, 1957
- Species: P. albonotata

Binomial name
- Phelocalocerella albonotata (Pic, 1935)

Genus of beetles

Phelocalocerella is a genus of disteniid beetles. It is monotypic, being represented by the single species Phelocalocerella albonotata.
