= Nupseranodes =

Scientific classification
- Kingdom: Animalia
- Phylum: Arthropoda
- Class: Insecta
- Order: Coleoptera
- Suborder: Polyphaga
- Infraorder: Cucujiformia
- Family: Disteniidae
- Genus: Nupseranodes; Adlbauer, 2006
- Species: N. constantini

Binomial name
- Nupseranodes constantini Adlbauer, 2006

Genus of beetles

Nupseranodes is a genus of disteniid beetles. It is monotypic, being represented by the single species Nupseranodes constantini.
