= Tengius =

Scientific classification
- Kingdom: Animalia
- Phylum: Arthropoda
- Class: Insecta
- Order: Coleoptera
- Suborder: Polyphaga
- Infraorder: Cucujiformia
- Family: Disteniidae
- Genus: Tengius; Matsushita, 1938
- Species: T. okuboi

Binomial name
- Tengius okuboi Matsushita, 1938

Genus of beetles

Tengius is a genus of disteniid beetles. It is monotypic, being represented by the single species Tengius okuboi.

There are two subspecies recognised:

- Tengius okuboi okuboi Matsushita, 1938
- Tengius okuboi kurosawai Makihara, 1986
