= Noemia =

Scientific classification
- Kingdom: Animalia
- Phylum: Arthropoda
- Class: Insecta
- Order: Coleoptera
- Suborder: Polyphaga
- Infraorder: Cucujiformia
- Family: Disteniidae
- Tribe: Disteniini
- Genus: Noemia; Pascoe, 1857

Genus of insects

Noemia is a genus of beetles in the family Disteniidae. It is distributed in East and Southeast Asia.

== Species ==
There are 26 to 27 recognized species:

- Noemia apicalis Villiers, 1958
- Noemia apicicornis Ritsema, 1890
- Noemia bawangi Vives, 2023
- Noemia bidentula Holzschuh, 2011
- Noemia brunnea Hudepohl, 1998
- Noemia catmani Vives & Cataytay-Mantilla, 2023†
- Noemia conformis Holzschuh, 2011
- Noemia cupreoviridana Hayashi, 1977
- Noemia distincta Holzschuh, 2011
- Noemia euconna Holzschuh, 2011
- Noemia flavicornis Pascoe, 1857
- Noemia incompta Gressitt, 1935
- Noemia leiothorax Holzschuh, 2011
- Noemia luctuosa Holzschuh, 2015
- Noemia mindanaoensis Gressitt, 1935
- Noemia mindorana Vives, 2012
- Noemia negrosensis Aurivillius, 1927
- Noemia opacicollis Holzschuh, 2011
- Noemia resplendens Holzschuh, 2011
- Noemia rubricollis Holzschuh, 2025
- Noemia rugulicollis Holzschuh, 2011
- Noemia semirufa Villiers, 1958
- Noemia sibuyanensis Aurivillius, 1927
- Noemia simplicicollis Pic, 1926
- Noemia stevensii Pascoe, 1857
- Noemia submetallica Gressitt, 1940
- Noemia virescens Schwarzer, 1927

† = not listed by the Old World Cerambycidae Catalog.
