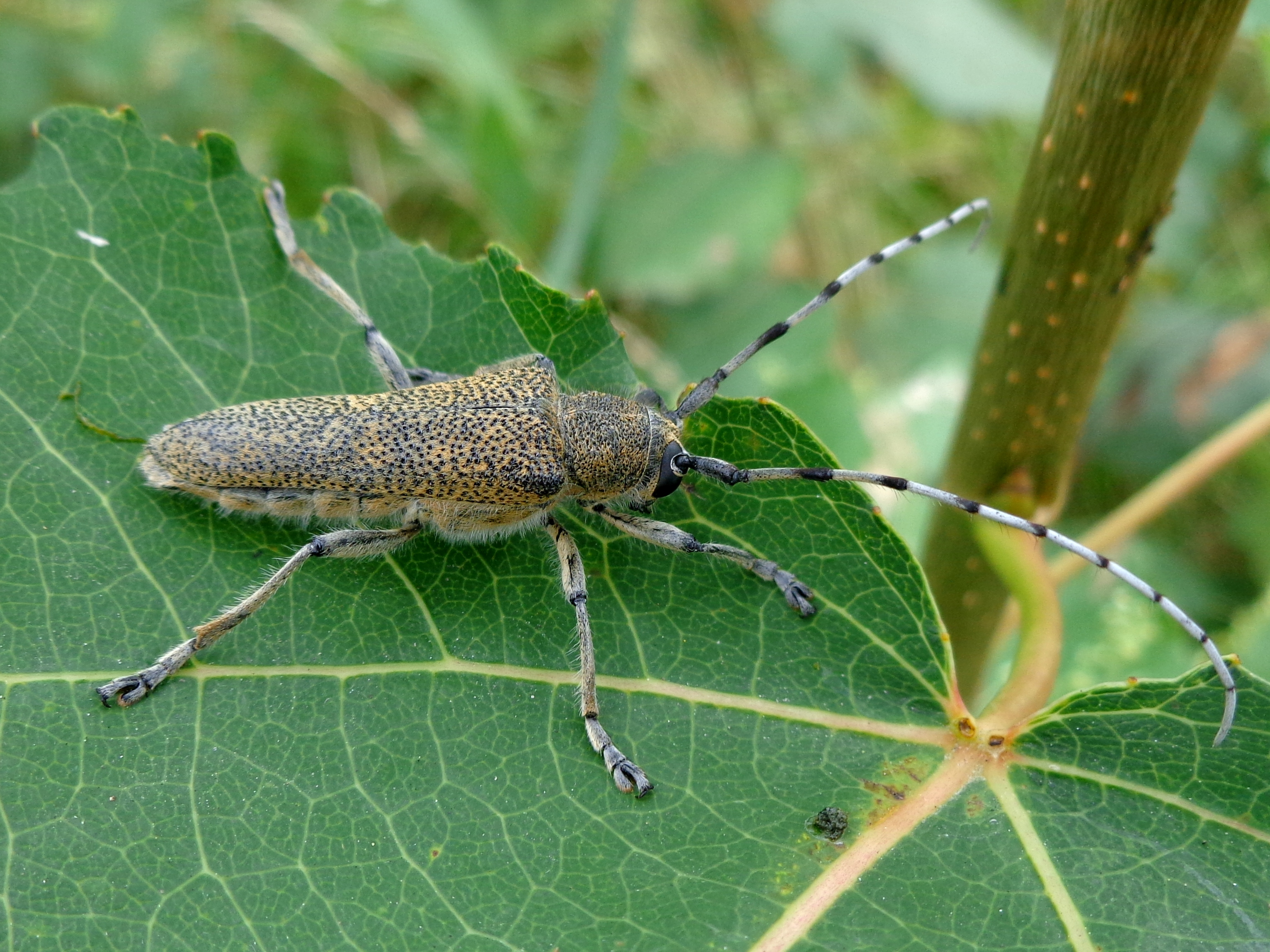
- Saperda carcharias

Scientific classification
- Kingdom: Animalia
- Phylum: Arthropoda
- Class: Insecta
- Order: Coleoptera
- Suborder: Polyphaga
- Infraorder: Cucujiformia
- Family: Cerambycidae
- Subfamily: Lamiinae
- Tribe: Saperdini

Synonyms
- Gleneini; Obereini Thomson, 1864; Obereitae Thomson, 1864; Phytoeciini Pascoe, 1864

= Saperdini =

Tribe of beetles

Saperdini is a tribe of longhorn beetles of the subfamily Lamiinae.

== Taxonomy ==
The following genera are recognised in the tribe Saperdini:

- Acronioglenea Breuning 1974
- Bifidunguiglenea Lin & Tavakilian, 2012
- Blamada Lin & Holzschuh 2013
- Cagosima Thomson, 1864
- Callundine Thomson, 1879
- Chlorisanis Pascoe, 1867
- Clavoserixia Breuning, 1954
- Conizonia Fairmaire, 1864
- Cristoberea Breuning, 1954
- Cyaneophytoecia Breuning, 1950
- Dyenmonus Thomson, 1868
- Dystomorphus Pic, 1926
- Elongatoserixia Breuning, 1982
- Entelopes Guérin-Méneville, 1844
- Epiglenea Bates 1884
- Eudaphisia Pic, 1926
- Eumecocera Solsky, 1871
- Eurycoptosia Reitter 1913
- Eutetrapha Bates, 1884
- Glenea Newman, 1842
- Gleneonupserha Breuning, 1949
- Glenida Gahan, 1888
- Gracilinitocris Breuning, 1950
- Hemicryllis Aurivillius, 1922
- Heteroglenea Gahan, 1897
- Iranocoptosia Villiers 1967
- Kabylophytoecia Sama, 2005
- Leuconitocris Breuning, 1950
- Linda Thomson, 1864
- Loboberea Breuning, 1950
- Malloderma Lacordaire, 1872
- Mallosia Mulsant, 1863
- Mallosiola Semenov, 1895
- Mandibularia Pic, 1925
- Mecas LeConte, 1852
- Menesia Mulsant, 1856
- Menesida Gahan, 1907
- Metallonupserha Breuning, 1980
- Micromallosia Pic 1900
- Micromandibularia Pic, 1936
- Mimoberea Teocchi 2001
- Mimocagosima Breuning, 1968
- Mimochlorisanis Breuning 1966
- Mimocoptosia Breuning & Villiers 1972
- Mimoglenea Breuning 1968
- Mystrocnemis Quedenfeldt, 1882
- Nedytisis Pascoe, 1866
- Neonitocris Breuning, 1950
- Neoserixia Schwarzer, 1925
- Neoxantha Pascoe, 1856
- Nietzscheana Zubov 2014
- Niponostenostola Ohbayashi 1958
- Nitakeris Teocchi, Sudre & Jiroux 2010
- Nupserha Thomson, 1860
- Nupseroberea Breuning 1950
- Oberea Mulsant, 1839
- Obereopsis Chevrolat, 1855
- Ossonis Pascoe, 1867
- Oxylia Mulsant, 1863
- Pannychella Gilmour, 1962
- Pannychis Thomson 1864
- Parablepisanis Breuning, 1950
- Paradystus Aurivillius, 1923
- Paraglenea Bates, 1866
- Paramallosia Fuchs, 1955
- Paramenesia Breuning, 1952
- Paranitocris Breuning, 1950
- Paraschoenionta Breuning, 1950
- Paraserixia Breuning, 1954
- Parastenostola Breuning, 1952
- Pardaloberea Pic, 1926
- Parentelopes Breuning, 1954
- Pareutetrapha Breuning, 1952
- Parobereopsis Breuning, 1956
- Phytoecia Dejean, 1835
- Poecilobactris Kolbe, 1897
- Praolia Bates, 1884
- Pseudochlorisanis Breuning, 1954
- Pseudoconizonia Breuning, 1956
- Pseudoglenea Gilmour & Breuning, 1963
- Pseudolinda Breuning, 1954
- Pseudonitocris Breuning, 1961
- Pseudonupserha Aurivillius, 1914
- Pseudophytoecia Breuning
- Pseudoschoenionta Breuning, 1954
- Pteromallosia Pic 1900
- Pygoptosia Reitter 1895
- Saperda Fabricius, 1775
- Saperdoglenea Breuning, 1964
- Savang Breuning, 1963
- Schoenionta J. Thomson, 1868
- Scytasis Pascoe, 1867
- Semiangusta Pic 1892
- Serixia Pascoe, 1856
- Serixiomenesia Breuning 1959
- Serixiophytoecia Breuning, 1950
- Spinoberea Breuning, 1954
- Stenostola Mulsant, 1839
- Stibara Hope, 1840
- Striophytoecia Breuning, 1969
- Thermistis Pascoe, 1867
- Thyestilla Aurivillius, 1923
- Trichonitocris Breuning, 1961
- Tsounkranaglenea Lin & Ge 2021
- Vespinitocris Breuning, 1950
- Zosne Pascoe, 1866

incertae sedis

- Saperda bilabilis Newman, 1850
- Saperda mellancholica Montrouzier, 1855
- Saperda punctata Montrouzier, 1855
