= Cachita =

Cachita may refer to:

- "Cachita" (song), by Rafael Hernández
- La Cachita, popular nickname of Our Lady of Charity, patroness of Cuba
- Alina María Hernández (1971–2016), Cuban transgender television actress
- Cachita Galán (1943–2004), Argentine singer
- Zosne cachita, species of beetle

== See also ==
- Cachito (disambiguation)
