= Zosne cincticornis =

Scientific classification
- Domain: Eukaryota
- Kingdom: Animalia
- Phylum: Arthropoda
- Class: Insecta
- Order: Coleoptera
- Suborder: Polyphaga
- Infraorder: Cucujiformia
- Family: Cerambycidae
- Genus: Zosne
- Species: Z. cincticornis

Binomial name
- Zosne cincticornis Pascoe, 1866

Synonyms
- Parathyestes roseolata Breuning, 1980; Pseudothyestes flavolineata Breuning, 1980

Species of beetle

Zosne cincticornis is a species of longhorn beetle in the tribe Saperdini that was first described by Pascoe in 1866.
