= Mimocagosima humeralis =

Scientific classification
- Kingdom: Animalia
- Phylum: Arthropoda
- Class: Insecta
- Order: Coleoptera
- Suborder: Polyphaga
- Infraorder: Cucujiformia
- Family: Cerambycidae
- Genus: Mimocagosima
- Species: M. humeralis

Binomial name
- Mimocagosima humeralis (Gressitt, 1951)

Synonyms
- Mandibularia humeralis Gressitt, 1951

Species of beetle

Mimocagosima humeralis is a species of beetle in the family Cerambycidae. It was described by J. Linsley Gressitt in 1951, originally under the genus Mandibularia. It is known from China.
