= Zosne matangensis =

Scientific classification
- Kingdom: Animalia
- Phylum: Arthropoda
- Class: Insecta
- Order: Coleoptera
- Suborder: Polyphaga
- Infraorder: Cucujiformia
- Family: Cerambycidae
- Genus: Zosne
- Species: Z. matagensis

Binomial name
- Zosne matagensis Breuning, 1950

Species of beetle

Zosne matangensis is a species of longhorn beetle in the tribe Saperdini in the genus Zosne that was discovered by Breuning in 1950.
