= Eudaphisia =

Scientific classification
- Kingdom: Animalia
- Phylum: Arthropoda
- Class: Insecta
- Order: Coleoptera
- Suborder: Polyphaga
- Infraorder: Cucujiformia
- Family: Cerambycidae
- Tribe: Saperdini
- Genus: Eudaphisia

Genus of longhorn beetles

Eudaphisia is a genus of longhorn beetles found in Asia. It was first identified by Pic in 1926 with the two species, Eudaphisia longicornis and Eudaphisia albonotata, the type species. In 1968, the species Eudaphisia albonotatipennis was identified by Breuning. Individuals have been identified in both Laos and Vietnam. In 1991, Eudaphisia longicornis was recorded in China, but was actually an incorrectly identified Neoserixia sp.
