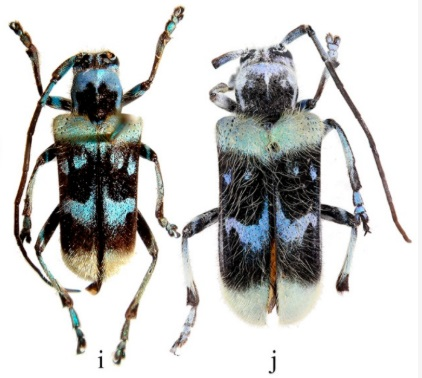
- i: male; j: female

Scientific classification
- Kingdom: Animalia
- Phylum: Arthropoda
- Class: Insecta
- Order: Coleoptera
- Suborder: Polyphaga
- Infraorder: Cucujiformia
- Family: Cerambycidae
- Genus: Malloderma
- Species: M. jianfenglingense

Binomial name
- Malloderma jianfenglingense (Hua, 1985)

Synonyms
- Paraglenea jianfenglingensis Hua, 1985

= Malloderma jianfenglingense =

Species of beetle

Malloderma jianfenglingense is a species of beetle of the family Cerambycidae. It is found in China (Hainan, Guangxi).
