= Spinoberea =

Scientific classification
- Kingdom: Animalia
- Phylum: Arthropoda
- Class: Insecta
- Order: Coleoptera
- Suborder: Polyphaga
- Infraorder: Cucujiformia
- Family: Cerambycidae
- Tribe: Saperdini
- Genus: Spinoberea

Genus of beetles

Spinoberea is a genus of longhorn beetles of the subfamily Lamiinae, containing the following species:

- Spinoberea cephalotes Gressitt, 1942
- Spinoberea subspinosa Pic, 1922
