= Malloderma pulchra =

Scientific classification
- Kingdom: Animalia
- Phylum: Arthropoda
- Class: Insecta
- Order: Coleoptera
- Suborder: Polyphaga
- Infraorder: Cucujiformia
- Family: Cerambycidae
- Genus: Malloderma
- Species: M. pulchra

Binomial name
- Malloderma pulchra (Pic, 1926)

Synonyms
- Paraglenea pulchra Pic, 1926

Species of beetle

Malloderma pulchra is a species of beetle in the family Cerambycidae. It was described by Maurice Pic in 1926. It is known from Vietnam and China.
