= Mystrocnemis =

Scientific classification
- Domain: Eukaryota
- Kingdom: Animalia
- Phylum: Arthropoda
- Class: Insecta
- Order: Coleoptera
- Suborder: Polyphaga
- Infraorder: Cucujiformia
- Family: Cerambycidae
- Tribe: Saperdini
- Genus: Mystrocnemis

Genus of beetles

Mystrocnemis is a genus of longhorn beetles of the subfamily Lamiinae, containing the following species:

- Mystrocnemis allardi Breuning, 1961
- Mystrocnemis analis (Fahraeus, 1872)
- Mystrocnemis apicalis Aurivillius, 1915
- Mystrocnemis atricollis Breuning, 1953
- Mystrocnemis bicolor Aurivillius, 1914
- Mystrocnemis flavoapicalis Breuning, 1950
- Mystrocnemis flavovittata Quedenfeldt, 1882
- Mystrocnemis fossulata Breuning, 1956
- Mystrocnemis stictica Aurivillius, 1914
