= Thyestilla =

Scientific classification
- Kingdom: Animalia
- Phylum: Arthropoda
- Class: Insecta
- Order: Coleoptera
- Suborder: Polyphaga
- Infraorder: Cucujiformia
- Family: Cerambycidae
- Tribe: Saperdini
- Genus: Thyestilla

Genus of beetles

Thyestilla is a genus of longhorn beetles of the subfamily Lamiinae, containing the following species:

- Thyestilla coerulea Breuning, 1943
- Thyestilla gebleri (Faldermann, 1835)
