= Mystrocnemis fossulata =

Scientific classification
- Kingdom: Animalia
- Phylum: Arthropoda
- Class: Insecta
- Order: Coleoptera
- Suborder: Polyphaga
- Infraorder: Cucujiformia
- Family: Cerambycidae
- Genus: Mystrocnemis
- Species: M. fossulata

Binomial name
- Mystrocnemis fossulata Breuning, 1956

Species of beetle

Mystrocnemis fossulata is a species of beetle in the family Cerambycidae. It was described by Stephan von Breuning in 1956.
