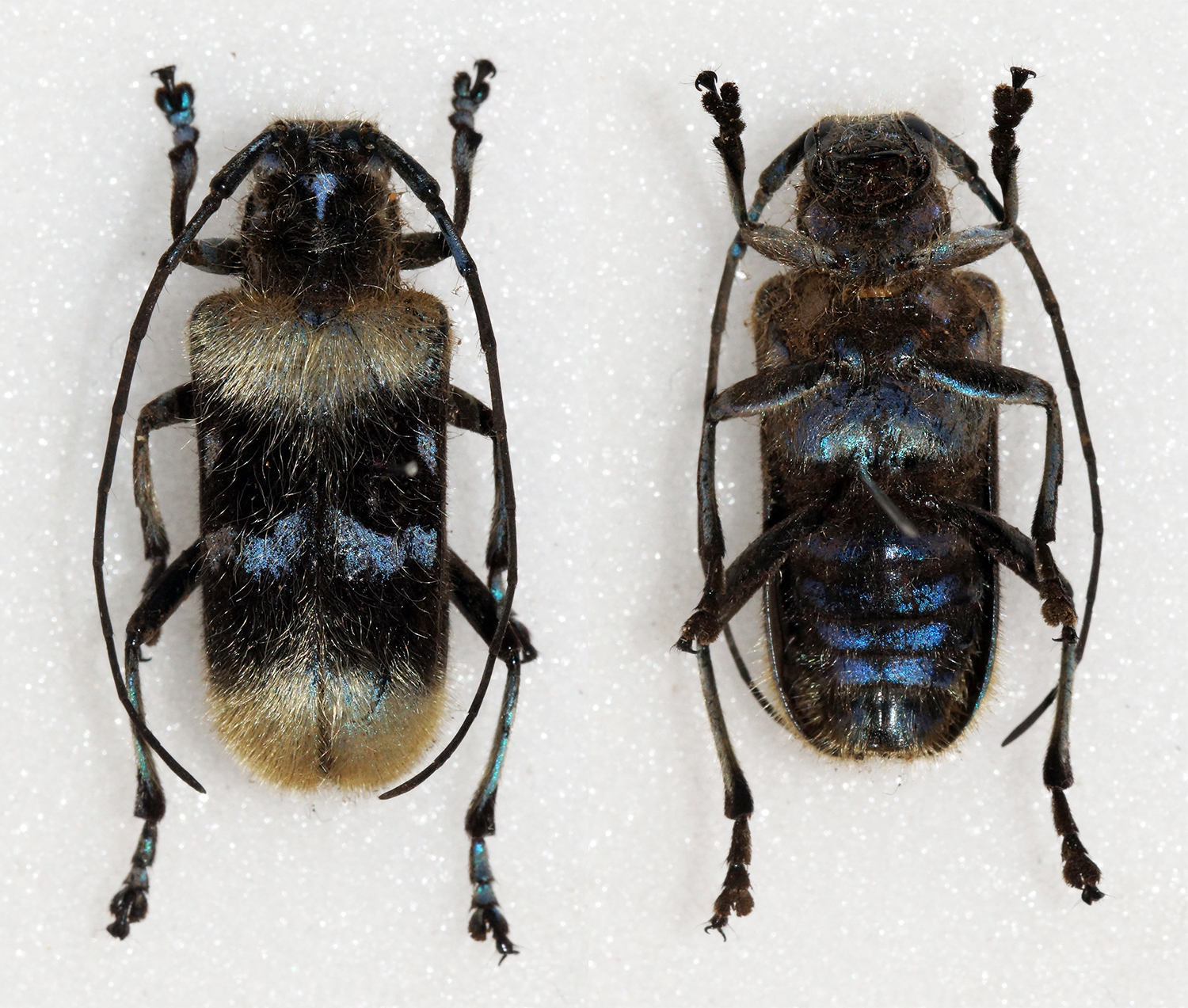

Scientific classification
- Kingdom: Animalia
- Phylum: Arthropoda
- Class: Insecta
- Order: Coleoptera
- Suborder: Polyphaga
- Infraorder: Cucujiformia
- Family: Cerambycidae
- Genus: Malloderma
- Species: M. pascoei

Binomial name
- Malloderma pascoei Lacordaire, 1872

= Malloderma pascoei =

Species of beetle

Malloderma pascoei is a species of beetle in the family Cerambycidae. It was described by Lacordaire in 1872. It is known from Laos, Bhutan, China, and Vietnam and Myanmar. It contains the varietas Malloderma pascoei var. tonkinea.
