= Ossonis =

Scientific classification
- Kingdom: Animalia
- Phylum: Arthropoda
- Class: Insecta
- Order: Coleoptera
- Suborder: Polyphaga
- Infraorder: Cucujiformia
- Family: Cerambycidae
- Subfamily: Lamiinae
- Tribe: Saperdini
- Genus: Ossonis; Pascoe, 1867

Genus of beetles

Ossonis is a genus of longhorn beetles of the subfamily Lamiinae, containing the following species:

- Ossonis clytomima Pascoe, 1867
- Ossonis hirsutipes Aurivillius, 1922
- Ossonis indica Breuning, 1954
- Ossonis mentaweiensis Schwarzer, 1930
- Ossonis modiglianii Breuning, 1950
- Ossonis sumatrensis (Pic, 1936)
