= Paramenesia subcarinata =

Scientific classification
- Kingdom: Animalia
- Phylum: Arthropoda
- Class: Insecta
- Order: Coleoptera
- Suborder: Polyphaga
- Infraorder: Cucujiformia
- Family: Cerambycidae
- Genus: Paramenesia
- Species: P. subcarinata

Binomial name
- Paramenesia subcarinata (Gressitt, 1951)

Synonyms
- Menesia subcarinata Gressitt, 1951

Species of beetle

Paramenesia subcarinata is a species of beetle in the family Cerambycidae. It was described by Gressitt in 1951. It is known from China.
