= Eudaphisia albonotata =

Scientific classification
- Kingdom: Animalia
- Phylum: Arthropoda
- Class: Insecta
- Order: Coleoptera
- Suborder: Polyphaga
- Infraorder: Cucujiformia
- Family: Cerambycidae
- Genus: Eudaphisia
- Species: E. albonotata

Binomial name
- Eudaphisia albonotata Pic, 1926

Genus of beetles

Eudaphisia albonotata is a species of beetle in the family Cerambycidae. It was previously identified as the only species in the genus Eudaphisia. It was described by Maurice Pic in 1926.
