= Paramenesia =

Scientific classification
- Kingdom: Animalia
- Phylum: Arthropoda
- Class: Insecta
- Order: Coleoptera
- Suborder: Polyphaga
- Infraorder: Cucujiformia
- Family: Cerambycidae
- Subfamily: Lamiinae
- Tribe: Saperdini
- Genus: Paramenesia; Breuning, 1952

Genus of beetles

Paramenesia is a genus of longhorn beetles of the subfamily Lamiinae, containing the following species:

- Paramenesia kasugensis (Seki & Kobayashi, 1935)
- Paramenesia nigrescens Breuning, 1966
- Paramenesia subcarinata (Gressitt, 1951)
- Paramenesia theaphia (Bates, 1884)
