= Menesida =

Scientific classification
- Domain: Eukaryota
- Kingdom: Animalia
- Phylum: Arthropoda
- Class: Insecta
- Order: Coleoptera
- Suborder: Polyphaga
- Infraorder: Cucujiformia
- Family: Cerambycidae
- Subfamily: Lamiinae
- Tribe: Saperdini
- Genus: Menesida; Gahan, 1907

Type species
- Menesida nigrita Gahan, 1907

Genus of beetles

Menesida is a genus of longhorn beetles of the subfamily Lamiinae, containing the following species:

- Menesida atricolor (Pic, 1925)
- Menesida bankaensis Breuning, 1951
- Menesida bicoloripes (Pic, 1925)
- Menesida carinifrons Aurivillius, 1922
- Menesida flavipennis Breuning, 1954
- Menesida fuscicornis Breuning, 1950
- Menesida fuscipennis Breuning, 1954
- Menesida marginalis Gahan, 1907
- Menesida nigripes Breuning, 1954
- Menesida nigrita Gahan, 1907
- Menesida planifrons Tippmann, 1951
- Menesida rufula Breuning, 1954
- Menesida testaceipennis (Pic, 1922)
