= Dyenmonus trivittatus =

Scientific classification
- Kingdom: Animalia
- Phylum: Arthropoda
- Class: Insecta
- Order: Coleoptera
- Suborder: Polyphaga
- Infraorder: Cucujiformia
- Family: Cerambycidae
- Genus: Dyenmonus
- Species: D. trivittatus

Binomial name
- Dyenmonus trivittatus Aurivillius, 1914

Species of beetle

Dyenmonus trivittatus is a species of beetle in the family Cerambycidae. It was described by Per Olof Christopher Aurivillius in 1914.

== Subspecies ==
- Dyenmonus trivittatus trivittatus Aurivillius, 1914
- Dyenmonus trivittatus wamensis Breuning, 1965
