= Schoenionta necydaloides =

Scientific classification
- Kingdom: Animalia
- Phylum: Arthropoda
- Clade: Pancrustacea
- Class: Insecta
- Order: Coleoptera
- Suborder: Polyphaga
- Infraorder: Cucujiformia
- Family: Cerambycidae
- Genus: Schoenionta
- Species: S. necydaloides

Binomial name
- Schoenionta necydaloides (Pascoe, 1867)

Synonyms
- Schoenionta testaceorufa J. Thomson, 1868; Oberea famelica Pascoe, 1867; Oberea necydaloides Pascoe, 1867

Species of beetle

Schoenionta necydaloides is a species of beetle in the family Cerambycidae. It was described by Francis Polkinghorne Pascoe in 1867. It is known from Malaysia, Borneo and Sulawesi.
