= Gleneonupserha =

Scientific classification
- Kingdom: Animalia
- Phylum: Arthropoda
- Class: Insecta
- Order: Coleoptera
- Suborder: Polyphaga
- Infraorder: Cucujiformia
- Family: Cerambycidae
- Tribe: Saperdini
- Genus: Gleneonupserha

Genus of beetles

Gleneonupserha is a genus of longhorn beetles of the subfamily Lamiinae, containing the following species:

- Gleneonupserha elongata Breuning, 1949
- Gleneonupserha vaga (Gahan, 1909)
- Gleneonupserha vitticollis Breuning, 1950
