= Pareutetrapha eximia =

Scientific classification
- Kingdom: Animalia
- Phylum: Arthropoda
- Class: Insecta
- Order: Coleoptera
- Suborder: Polyphaga
- Infraorder: Cucujiformia
- Family: Cerambycidae
- Genus: Pareutetrapha
- Species: P. eximia

Binomial name
- Pareutetrapha eximia (Bates, 1884)

Synonyms
- Paraglenea eximia Bates, 1884

Species of beetle

Pareutetrapha eximia is a species of beetle in the family Cerambycidae. It was described by Henry Walter Bates in 1884, originally under the genus Paraglenea.
