= Schoenionta vespiventris =

Scientific classification
- Domain: Eukaryota
- Kingdom: Animalia
- Phylum: Arthropoda
- Class: Insecta
- Order: Coleoptera
- Suborder: Polyphaga
- Infraorder: Cucujiformia
- Family: Cerambycidae
- Genus: Schoenionta
- Species: S. vespiventris

Binomial name
- Schoenionta vespiventris Thomson, 1868

Species of beetle

Schoenionta vespiventris is a species of beetle in the family Cerambycidae. It was described by James Thomson in 1868.
