= Spinoberea cephalotes =

Scientific classification
- Kingdom: Animalia
- Phylum: Arthropoda
- Class: Insecta
- Order: Coleoptera
- Suborder: Polyphaga
- Infraorder: Cucujiformia
- Family: Cerambycidae
- Genus: Spinoberea
- Species: S. cephalotes

Binomial name
- Spinoberea cephalotes Gressitt, 1942

Species of beetle

Spinoberea cephalotes is a species of beetle in the family Cerambycidae. It was described by Gressitt in 1942.
