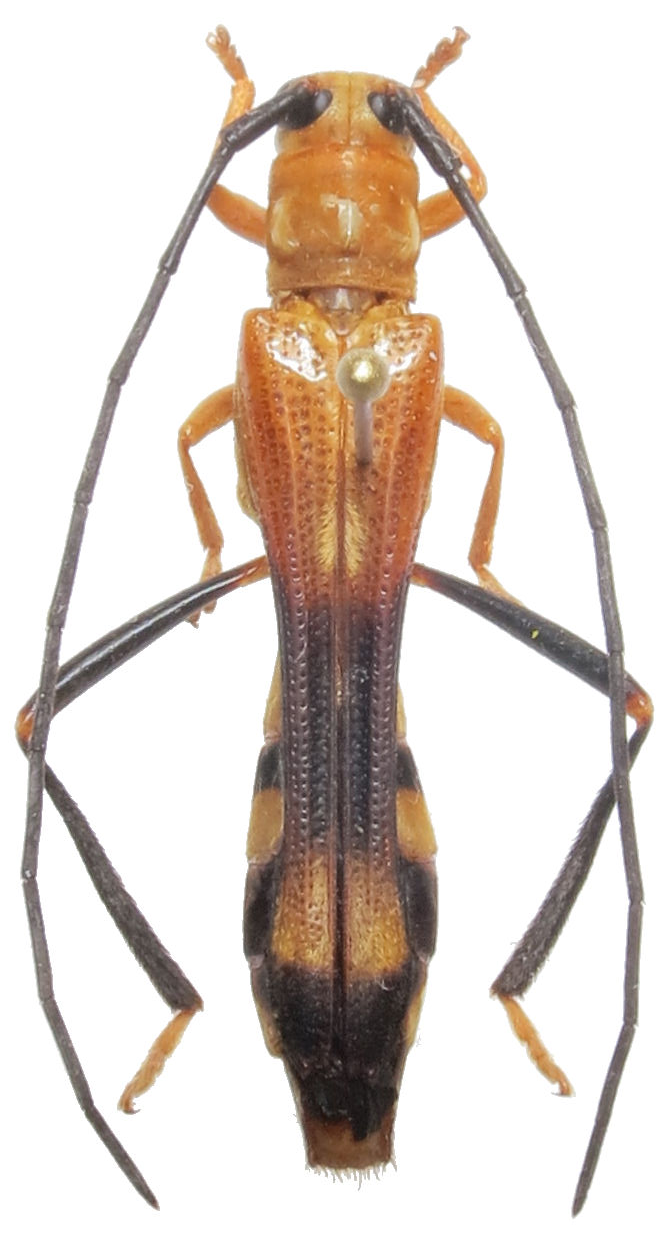
- Vespinitocris morio

Scientific classification
- Domain: Eukaryota
- Kingdom: Animalia
- Phylum: Arthropoda
- Class: Insecta
- Order: Coleoptera
- Suborder: Polyphaga
- Infraorder: Cucujiformia
- Family: Cerambycidae
- Tribe: Saperdini
- Genus: Vespinitocris

= Vespinitocris =

Genus of beetles

Vespinitocris is a genus of longhorn beetles of the subfamily Lamiinae, containing the following species:

subgenus Ichneumonitocris

- Vespinitocris ichneumon (Hintz, 1919)

subgenus Vespinitocris

- Vespinitocris camerunica Breuning, 1956
- Vespinitocris dux (Jordan, 1894)
- Vespinitocris morio (Jordan, 1903)
- Vespinitocris sessensis Breuning, 1950
- Vespinitocris tavakiliani Sudre & Téocchi, 2005
