= Parastenostola nigroantennata =

Scientific classification
- Kingdom: Animalia
- Phylum: Arthropoda
- Class: Insecta
- Order: Coleoptera
- Suborder: Polyphaga
- Infraorder: Cucujiformia
- Family: Cerambycidae
- Genus: Parastenostola
- Species: P. nigroantennata

Binomial name
- Parastenostola nigroantennata Lin, Li & Yang, 2008

Species of beetle

Parastenostola nigroantennata is a species of beetle in the family Cerambycidae. It was described by Lin, Li, and Yang in 2008. It is known from Taiwan and China.

== Subspecies ==
- Parastenostola nigroantennata taiwanensis Lin, Li & Yang, 2008
- Parastenostola nigroantennata nigroantennata Lin, Li & Yang, 2008
