= Vespinitocris sessensis =

Scientific classification
- Kingdom: Animalia
- Phylum: Arthropoda
- Class: Insecta
- Order: Coleoptera
- Suborder: Polyphaga
- Infraorder: Cucujiformia
- Family: Cerambycidae
- Genus: Vespinitocris
- Species: V. sessensis

Binomial name
- Vespinitocris sessensis Breuning, 1950

Species of beetle

Vespinitocris sessensis is a species of beetle in the family Cerambycidae. It was described by Stephan von Breuning in 1950. It is known from Tanzania.
