= Neoserixia schwarzeri =

Scientific classification
- Kingdom: Animalia
- Phylum: Arthropoda
- Class: Insecta
- Order: Coleoptera
- Suborder: Polyphaga
- Infraorder: Cucujiformia
- Family: Cerambycidae
- Genus: Neoserixia
- Species: N. schwarzeri

Binomial name
- Neoserixia schwarzeri Gressitt, 1935

Species of beetle

Neoserixia schwarzeri is a species of beetle in the family Cerambycidae. It was described by Gressitt in 1935.
