= Nedytisis obrioides =

Scientific classification
- Kingdom: Animalia
- Phylum: Arthropoda
- Class: Insecta
- Order: Coleoptera
- Suborder: Polyphaga
- Infraorder: Cucujiformia
- Family: Cerambycidae
- Genus: Nedytisis
- Species: N. obrioides

Binomial name
- Nedytisis obrioides Pascoe, 1866

Species of beetle

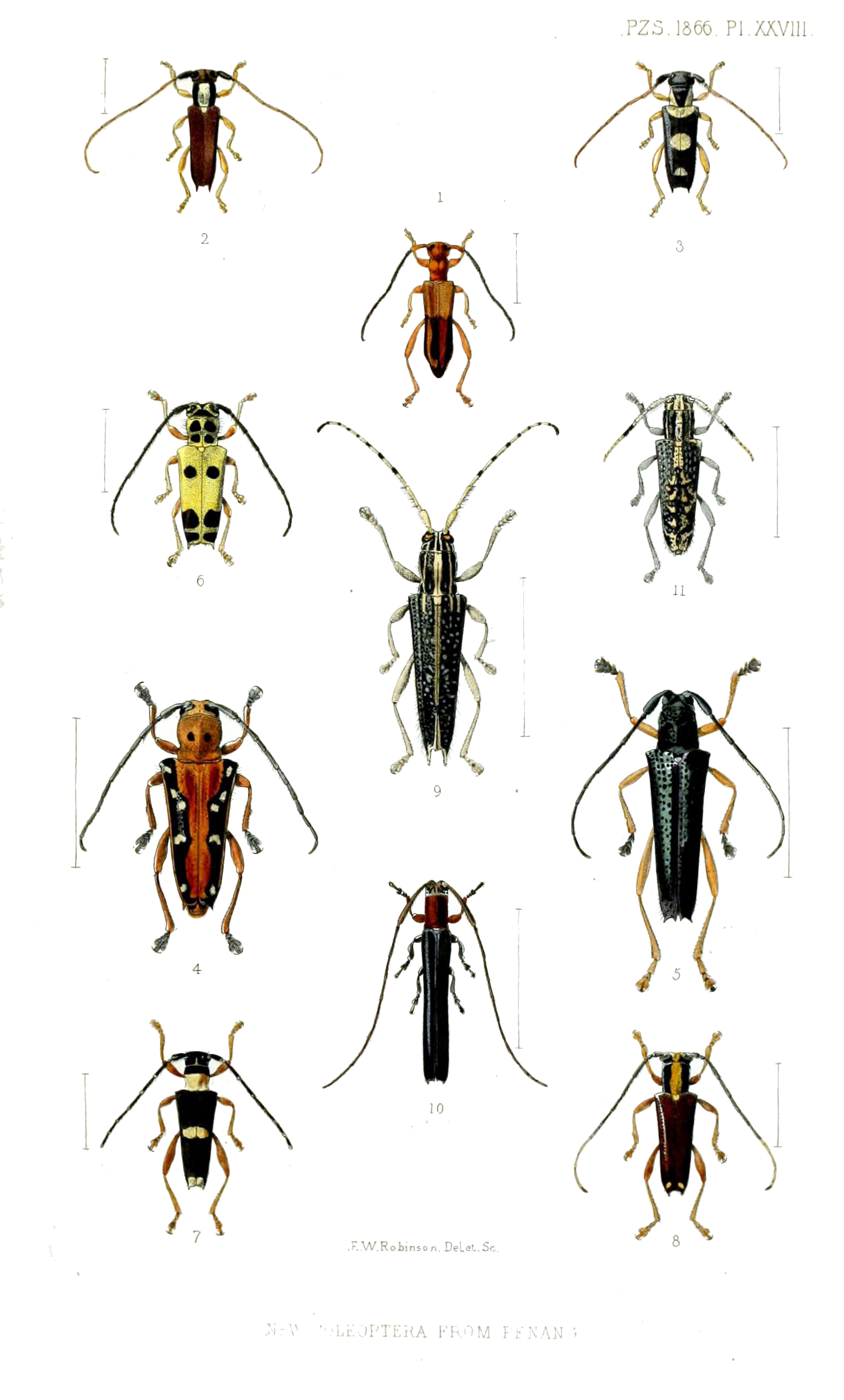
Flat-faced longhorn beetles from Penang

Nedytisis obrioides is a species of beetle in the family Cerambycidae. It was described by Francis Polkinghorne Pascoe in 1866. It is known from Malaysia and Borneo.
