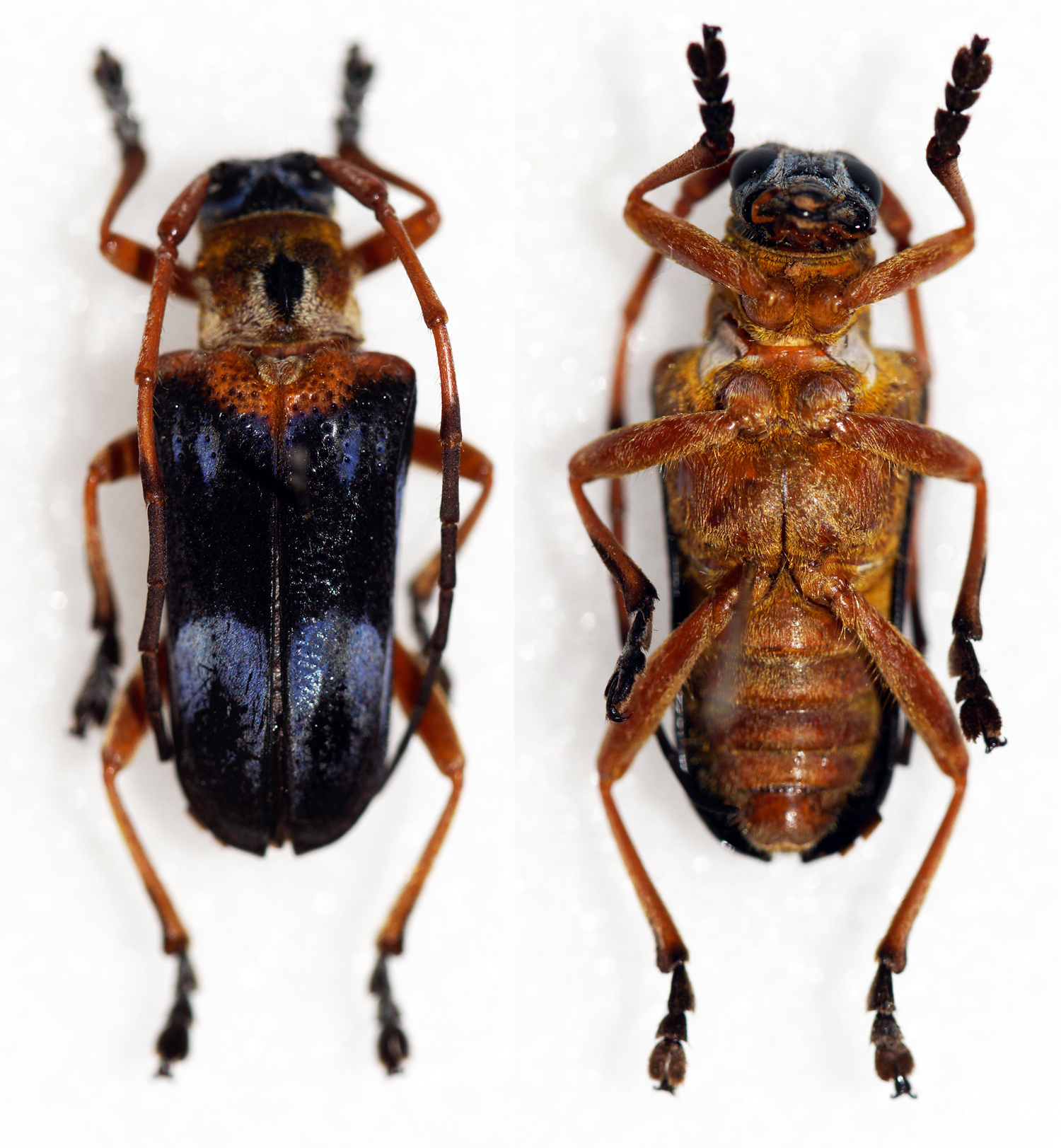

Scientific classification
- Kingdom: Animalia
- Phylum: Arthropoda
- Class: Insecta
- Order: Coleoptera
- Suborder: Polyphaga
- Infraorder: Cucujiformia
- Family: Cerambycidae
- Genus: Glenida
- Species: G. puncticollis

Binomial name
- Glenida puncticollis Breuning, 1961

= Glenida puncticollis =

Species of beetle

Glenida puncticollis is a species of beetle in the family Cerambycidae. It was described by Stephan von Breuning in 1961. It is known from Vietnam.
