= Parastenostola =

Scientific classification
- Kingdom: Animalia
- Phylum: Arthropoda
- Class: Insecta
- Order: Coleoptera
- Suborder: Polyphaga
- Infraorder: Cucujiformia
- Family: Cerambycidae
- Tribe: Saperdini
- Genus: Parastenostola

Genus of beetles

Parastenostola is a genus of longhorn beetles of the subfamily Lamiinae, containing the following species:

- Parastenostola brunnipes (Gahan, 1888)
- Parastenostola nigroantennata Lin, Li & Yang, 2008
