= Menesida atricolor =

Scientific classification
- Kingdom: Animalia
- Phylum: Arthropoda
- Class: Insecta
- Order: Coleoptera
- Suborder: Polyphaga
- Infraorder: Cucujiformia
- Family: Cerambycidae
- Genus: Menesida
- Species: M. atricolor

Binomial name
- Menesida atricolor (Pic, 1925)

Species of beetle

Menesida atricolor is a species of beetle in the family Cerambycidae. It was described by Maurice Pic in 1925.
