= Mystrocnemis analis =

Scientific classification
- Domain: Eukaryota
- Kingdom: Animalia
- Phylum: Arthropoda
- Class: Insecta
- Order: Coleoptera
- Suborder: Polyphaga
- Infraorder: Cucujiformia
- Family: Cerambycidae
- Genus: Mystrocnemis
- Species: M. analis

Binomial name
- Mystrocnemis analis (Fahraeus, 1872)

Species of beetle

Mystrocnemis analis is a species of beetle in the family Cerambycidae. It was described by Fahraeus in 1872.
