= Dystomorphus nigrosignatus =

Scientific classification
- Domain: Eukaryota
- Kingdom: Animalia
- Phylum: Arthropoda
- Class: Insecta
- Order: Coleoptera
- Suborder: Polyphaga
- Infraorder: Cucujiformia
- Family: Cerambycidae
- Genus: Dystomorphus
- Species: D. nigrosignatus

Binomial name
- Dystomorphus nigrosignatus Pu, Wang & Li, 1998

Species of beetle

Dystomorphus nigrosignatus is a species of beetle in the family Cerambycidae. It was described by Pu, Wang and Li in 1998.
