= Pareutetrapha nigromaculata =

Scientific classification
- Kingdom: Animalia
- Phylum: Arthropoda
- Class: Insecta
- Order: Coleoptera
- Suborder: Polyphaga
- Infraorder: Cucujiformia
- Family: Cerambycidae
- Genus: Pareutetrapha
- Species: P. nigromaculata

Binomial name
- Pareutetrapha nigromaculata Breuning, 1952

Species of beetle

Pareutetrapha nigromaculata is a species of beetle in the family Cerambycidae. It was described by Stephan von Breuning in 1952.
