= Glenida cyaneipennis =

Scientific classification
- Domain: Eukaryota
- Kingdom: Animalia
- Phylum: Arthropoda
- Class: Insecta
- Order: Coleoptera
- Suborder: Polyphaga
- Infraorder: Cucujiformia
- Family: Cerambycidae
- Genus: Glenida
- Species: G. cyaneipennis

Binomial name
- Glenida cyaneipennis Gahan, 1888

Species of beetle

Glenida cyaneipennis is a species of beetle in the family Cerambycidae. It was described by Charles Joseph Gahan in 1888. It is known from Taiwan and China.

== Subspecies ==
- Glenida cyaneipennis cyaneipennis Gahan, 1888
- Glenida cyaneipennis ikedai Mitono, 1939
