= Hemicryllis =

Scientific classification
- Kingdom: Animalia
- Phylum: Arthropoda
- Class: Insecta
- Order: Coleoptera
- Suborder: Polyphaga
- Infraorder: Cucujiformia
- Family: Cerambycidae
- Tribe: Saperdini
- Genus: Hemicryllis; Aurivillius, 1922
- Species: H. alboguttata

Binomial name
- Hemicryllis alboguttata Aurivillius, 1922

Genus of beetles

Hemicryllis is a monotypic beetle genus in the family Cerambycidae described by Per Olof Christopher Aurivillius in 1922. Its only species, Hemicryllis alboguttata, was described by the same author in the same year.
