= Pareutetrapha sylvia =

Scientific classification
- Kingdom: Animalia
- Phylum: Arthropoda
- Class: Insecta
- Order: Coleoptera
- Suborder: Polyphaga
- Infraorder: Cucujiformia
- Family: Cerambycidae
- Genus: Pareutetrapha
- Species: P. sylvia

Binomial name
- Pareutetrapha sylvia Gressitt, 1951

Species of beetle

Pareutetrapha sylvia is a species of beetle in the family Cerambycidae. It was described by Gressitt in 1951. It is known from Vietnam.
