= Savang sulphuratus =

Scientific classification
- Kingdom: Animalia
- Phylum: Arthropoda
- Class: Insecta
- Order: Coleoptera
- Suborder: Polyphaga
- Infraorder: Cucujiformia
- Family: Cerambycidae
- Genus: Savang
- Species: S. sulphuratus

Binomial name
- Savang sulphuratus Pesarini & Sabbadini, 1997

Species of beetle

Savang sulphuratus is a species of beetle in the family Cerambycidae. It was described by Pesarini and Sabbadini in 1997.
