= Paraserixia =

Scientific classification
- Kingdom: Animalia
- Phylum: Arthropoda
- Class: Insecta
- Order: Coleoptera
- Suborder: Polyphaga
- Infraorder: Cucujiformia
- Family: Cerambycidae
- Tribe: Saperdini
- Genus: Paraserixia

Genus of beetles

Paraserixia is a genus of longhorn beetles of the subfamily Lamiinae, containing the following species:

- Paraserixia borneensis Breuning, 1954
- Paraserixia flava Breuning, 1965
