= Parentelopes =

Scientific classification
- Kingdom: Animalia
- Phylum: Arthropoda
- Clade: Pancrustacea
- Class: Insecta
- Order: Coleoptera
- Suborder: Polyphaga
- Infraorder: Cucujiformia
- Family: Cerambycidae
- Subfamily: Lamiinae
- Tribe: Saperdini
- Genus: Parentelopes; Breuning, 1954

Type species
- Parentelopes albomaculatus (Pic, 1933)

Genus of beetles

Parentelopes is a genus of beetles in the family Cerambycidae.

Species:

- Parentelopes albomaculatus (Pic, 1933)
- Parentelopes kalimantanus Vives & Heffern, 2016
