= Paradystus =

Scientific classification
- Kingdom: Animalia
- Phylum: Arthropoda
- Class: Insecta
- Order: Coleoptera
- Suborder: Polyphaga
- Infraorder: Cucujiformia
- Family: Cerambycidae
- Subfamily: Lamiinae
- Tribe: Saperdini
- Genus: Paradystus; Aurivillius, 1923

Genus of beetles

Paradystus is a genus of longhorn beetles of the subfamily Lamiinae, containing the following species:

- Paradystus ceylonicus Breuning, 1954
- Paradystus infrarufus Breuning, 1954
- Paradystus innotatus Breuning, 1954
- Paradystus notator (Pascoe, 1867)
