= Paraschoenionta =

Scientific classification
- Kingdom: Animalia
- Phylum: Arthropoda
- Class: Insecta
- Order: Coleoptera
- Suborder: Polyphaga
- Infraorder: Cucujiformia
- Family: Cerambycidae
- Tribe: Saperdini
- Genus: Paraschoenionta; Breuning, 1950
- Species: P. shelfordi

Binomial name
- Paraschoenionta shelfordi Breuning, 1950

Synonyms
- Schoenionta Shelfordi Aurivillius, 1923; Paraschoenionta shelfordi (Aurivillius, 1923)

Genus of beetles

Paraschoenionta is a monotypic beetle genus in the family Cerambycidae described by Stephan von Breuning in 1950. Its only species, Paraschoenionta shelfordi, occurs in Borneo.

== Taxonomy ==
Paraschoenionta shelfordi was originally described as Schoenionta Shelfordi by Per Olof Christopher Aurivillius in 1923. This name is considered nomen nudum and taxon was named von Breuning as Paraschoenionta shelfordi in 1950. Other sources consider Schoenionta Shelfordi as having been a valid name and credit Aurivillius as the author.

== Description ==
Paraschoenionta shelfordi measure 17–24 mm (0.67–0.94 in) in length.
