= Parentelopes albomaculatus =

Scientific classification
- Kingdom: Animalia
- Phylum: Arthropoda
- Clade: Pancrustacea
- Class: Insecta
- Order: Coleoptera
- Suborder: Polyphaga
- Infraorder: Cucujiformia
- Family: Cerambycidae
- Genus: Parentelopes
- Species: P. albomaculatus

Binomial name
- Parentelopes albomaculatus (Pic, 1933)

Species of beetle

Parentelopes albomaculatus is a species of beetle in the family Cerambycidae. It was described by Maurice Pic in 1933.
