= Pseudoschoenionta =

Scientific classification
- Kingdom: Animalia
- Phylum: Arthropoda
- Class: Insecta
- Order: Coleoptera
- Suborder: Polyphaga
- Infraorder: Cucujiformia
- Family: Cerambycidae
- Tribe: Saperdini
- Genus: Pseudoschoenionta; Breuning, 1954
- Species: P. libellula

Binomial name
- Pseudoschoenionta libellula (Jordan, 1894)

Genus of beetles

Pseudoschoenionta is a monotypic beetle genus in the family Cerambycidae erected by Stephan von Breuning in 1954. Its only species, Pseudoschoenionta libellula, was described by Karl Jordan in 1894.
