= Gracilinitocris gracilenta =

Scientific classification
- Kingdom: Animalia
- Phylum: Arthropoda
- Class: Insecta
- Order: Coleoptera
- Suborder: Polyphaga
- Infraorder: Cucujiformia
- Family: Cerambycidae
- Genus: Gracilinitocris
- Species: G. gracilenta

Binomial name
- Gracilinitocris gracilenta (Kolbe, 1893)

Species of beetle

Gracilinitocris gracilenta is a species of beetle in the family Cerambycidae. It was described by Hermann Julius Kolbe in 1893.
