= Parastenostola brunnipes =

Scientific classification
- Kingdom: Animalia
- Phylum: Arthropoda
- Class: Insecta
- Order: Coleoptera
- Suborder: Polyphaga
- Infraorder: Cucujiformia
- Family: Cerambycidae
- Genus: Parastenostola
- Species: P. brunnipes

Binomial name
- Parastenostola brunnipes (Gahan, 1888)

Synonyms
- Saperda brunnipes Gahan, 1888; Mandibularia quadricolor Gressitt, 1951

Species of beetle

Parastenostola brunnipes is a species of beetle in the family Cerambycidae. It was described by Charles Joseph Gahan in 1888 and is known from China.
