= Menesida nigripes =

Scientific classification
- Kingdom: Animalia
- Phylum: Arthropoda
- Class: Insecta
- Order: Coleoptera
- Suborder: Polyphaga
- Infraorder: Cucujiformia
- Family: Cerambycidae
- Genus: Menesida
- Species: M. nigripes

Binomial name
- Menesida nigripes Breuning, 1954

Species of beetle

Menesida nigripes is a species of beetle in the family Cerambycidae. It was described by Stephan von Breuning in 1954.
