= Ossonis mentaweiensis =

Scientific classification
- Kingdom: Animalia
- Phylum: Arthropoda
- Class: Insecta
- Order: Coleoptera
- Suborder: Polyphaga
- Infraorder: Cucujiformia
- Family: Cerambycidae
- Genus: Ossonis
- Species: O. mentaweiensis

Binomial name
- Ossonis mentaweiensis Schwarzer, 1930

Species of beetle

Ossonis mentaweiensis is a species of beetle in the family Cerambycidae. It was described by Bernhard Schwarzer in 1930.
