= Paradystus notator =

Scientific classification
- Kingdom: Animalia
- Phylum: Arthropoda
- Clade: Pancrustacea
- Class: Insecta
- Order: Coleoptera
- Suborder: Polyphaga
- Infraorder: Cucujiformia
- Family: Cerambycidae
- Genus: Paradystus
- Species: P. notator

Binomial name
- Paradystus notator (Pascoe, 1867)

Synonyms
- Dystus notator Pascoe, 1867

Species of beetle

Paradystus notator is a species of beetle in the family Cerambycidae. It was described by Francis Polkinghorne Pascoe in 1867. It is known from Borneo, Java, Singapore, Malaysia, and Sumatra.

== Varietas ==
- Paradystus notator var. sericeoprolongatus Breuning, 1954
- Paradystus notator var. fuscoampliatus Breuning, 1954
