= Menesida marginalis =

Scientific classification
- Domain: Eukaryota
- Kingdom: Animalia
- Phylum: Arthropoda
- Class: Insecta
- Order: Coleoptera
- Suborder: Polyphaga
- Infraorder: Cucujiformia
- Family: Cerambycidae
- Genus: Menesida
- Species: M. marginalis

Binomial name
- Menesida marginalis Gahan, 1907

Species of beetle

Menesida marginalis is a species of beetle in the family Cerambycidae. It was described by Charles Joseph Gahan in 1907.
