= Pareutetrapha magnifica =

Scientific classification
- Kingdom: Animalia
- Phylum: Arthropoda
- Class: Insecta
- Order: Coleoptera
- Suborder: Polyphaga
- Infraorder: Cucujiformia
- Family: Cerambycidae
- Genus: Pareutetrapha
- Species: P. magnifica

Binomial name
- Pareutetrapha magnifica (Schwarzer, 1925)

Synonyms
- Saperda magnifica Schwarzer, 1925; Paraglenea magnifica (Schwarzer) Matsushita, 1933

Species of beetle

Pareutetrapha magnifica is a species of beetle in the family Cerambycidae. It was described by Schwarzer in 1925, originally under the genus Saperda. It is known from Taiwan and Japan.

== Subspecies ==
- Pareutetrapha magnifica magnifica (Schwarzer, 1925)
- Pareutetrapha magnifica caeruleithoracica Takakuwa, 1984
