= Dyenmonus nigrifrons =

Scientific classification
- Kingdom: Animalia
- Phylum: Arthropoda
- Class: Insecta
- Order: Coleoptera
- Suborder: Polyphaga
- Infraorder: Cucujiformia
- Family: Cerambycidae
- Genus: Dyenmonus
- Species: D. nigrifrons

Binomial name
- Dyenmonus nigrifrons Aurivillius, 1914

Species of beetle

Dyenmonus nigrifrons is a species of beetle in the family Cerambycidae. It was described by Per Olof Christopher Aurivillius in 1914.
