= Chlorisanis basirufofemoralis =

Scientific classification
- Kingdom: Animalia
- Phylum: Arthropoda
- Class: Insecta
- Order: Coleoptera
- Suborder: Polyphaga
- Infraorder: Cucujiformia
- Family: Cerambycidae
- Genus: Chlorisanis
- Species: C. basirufofemoralis

Binomial name
- Chlorisanis basirufofemoralis Breuning, 1957

Species of beetle

Chlorisanis basirufofemoralis is a species of beetle in the family Cerambycidae. It was described by Stephan von Breuning in 1957. It is known from Sumatra.
