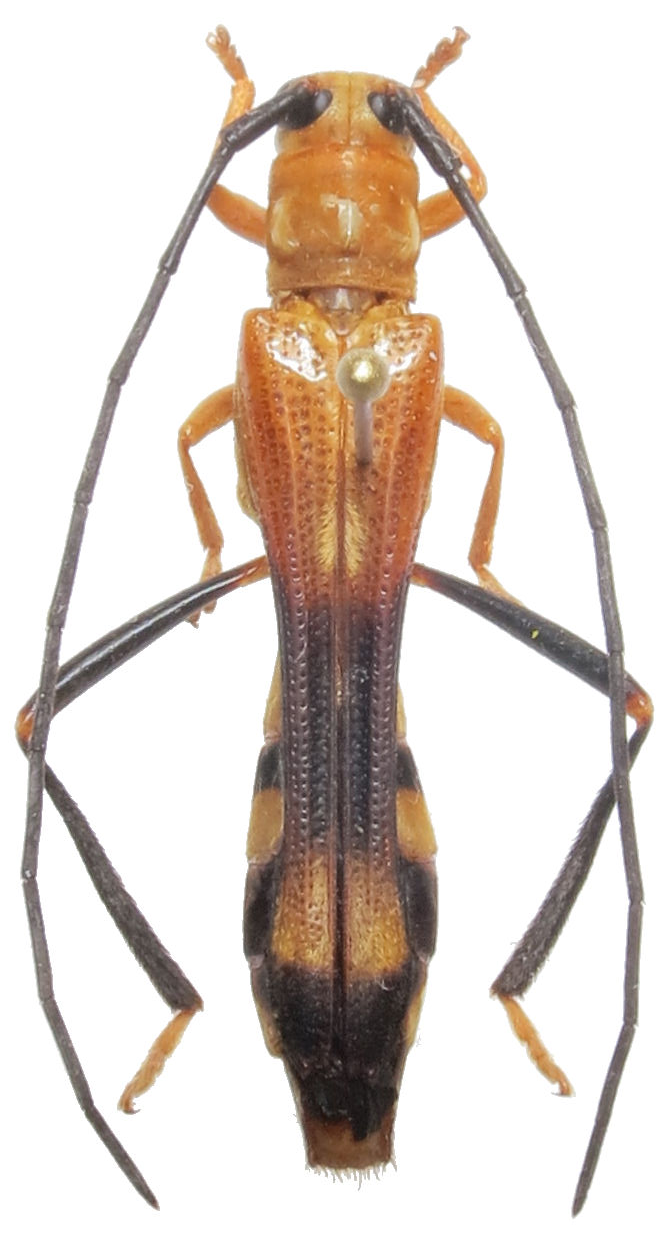
- Vespinitocris morio from Togo

Scientific classification
- Domain: Eukaryota
- Kingdom: Animalia
- Phylum: Arthropoda
- Class: Insecta
- Order: Coleoptera
- Suborder: Polyphaga
- Infraorder: Cucujiformia
- Family: Cerambycidae
- Genus: Vespinitocris
- Species: V. morio

Binomial name
- Vespinitocris morio (Jordan, 1903)

= Vespinitocris morio =

Species of beetle

Vespinitocris morio is a species of beetle in the family Cerambycidae. It was described by Karl Jordan in 1903.
