= Pareutetrapha =

Scientific classification
- Kingdom: Animalia
- Phylum: Arthropoda
- Class: Insecta
- Order: Coleoptera
- Suborder: Polyphaga
- Infraorder: Cucujiformia
- Family: Cerambycidae
- Subfamily: Lamiinae
- Tribe: Saperdini
- Genus: Pareutetrapha; Breuning, 1952

Genus of beetles

Pareutetrapha is a genus of longhorn beetles of the subfamily Lamiinae, containing the following species:

- Pareutetrapha eximia (Bates, 1884)
- Pareutetrapha magnifica (Schwarzer, 1925)
- Pareutetrapha nigromaculata Breuning, 1952
- Pareutetrapha olivacea Breuning, 1952
- Pareutetrapha simulans (Bates, 1873)
- Pareutetrapha sylvia Gressitt, 1951
