= Mystrocnemis atricollis =

Scientific classification
- Kingdom: Animalia
- Phylum: Arthropoda
- Clade: Pancrustacea
- Class: Insecta
- Order: Coleoptera
- Suborder: Polyphaga
- Infraorder: Cucujiformia
- Family: Cerambycidae
- Genus: Mystrocnemis
- Species: M. atricollis

Binomial name
- Mystrocnemis atricollis Breuning, 1953

Species of beetle

Mystrocnemis atricollis is a species of beetle in the family Cerambycidae. It was described by Stephan von Breuning in 1953.
