= Thyestilla gebleri =

Scientific classification
- Kingdom: Animalia
- Phylum: Arthropoda
- Class: Insecta
- Order: Coleoptera
- Suborder: Polyphaga
- Infraorder: Cucujiformia
- Family: Cerambycidae
- Genus: Thyestilla
- Species: T. gebleri

Binomial name
- Thyestilla gebleri (Faldermann, 1835)

Synonyms
- Thyestilla lepesmei Gilmour, 1950; Thyestes gebleri (Faldermann) Bates, 1873; Saperda gebleri Faldermann, 1835

Species of beetle

Thyestilla gebleri is a species of beetle in the family Cerambycidae. It was described by Faldermann in 1835, originally under the genus Saperda. It is known from Mongolia, Japan, Russia, China, North Korea, and South Korea. It feeds on Boehmeria nivea and Cannabis sativa.

== Varietas ==
- Thyestilla gebleri var. subuniformis Breuning, 1952
- Thyestilla gebleri var. pubescens (Thomson, 1864)
- Thyestilla gebleri var. funebris (Gahan, 1888)
- Thyestilla gebleri var. transitiva Breuning, 1952
