= Paramenesia kasugensis =

Scientific classification
- Kingdom: Animalia
- Phylum: Arthropoda
- Class: Insecta
- Order: Coleoptera
- Suborder: Polyphaga
- Infraorder: Cucujiformia
- Family: Cerambycidae
- Genus: Paramenesia
- Species: P. kasugensis

Binomial name
- Paramenesia kasugensis (Seki & Kobayashi, 1935)

Species of beetle

Paramenesia kasugensis is a species of beetle in the family Cerambycidae. It was described by Seki and Kobayashi in 1935. It is known from Japan.
