= Savang =

Scientific classification
- Kingdom: Animalia
- Phylum: Arthropoda
- Class: Insecta
- Order: Coleoptera
- Suborder: Polyphaga
- Infraorder: Cucujiformia
- Family: Cerambycidae
- Tribe: Saperdini
- Genus: Savang

Genus of beetles

Savang is a genus of longhorn beetles of the subfamily Lamiinae, containing the following species:

- Savang sulphuratus Pesarini & Sabbadini, 1997
- Savang vatthanai Breuning, 1963
