= Mystrocnemis bicolor =

Scientific classification
- Domain: Eukaryota
- Kingdom: Animalia
- Phylum: Arthropoda
- Class: Insecta
- Order: Coleoptera
- Suborder: Polyphaga
- Infraorder: Cucujiformia
- Family: Cerambycidae
- Genus: Mystrocnemis
- Species: M. bicolor

Binomial name
- Mystrocnemis bicolor Aurivillius, 1914

Species of beetle

Mystrocnemis bicolor is a species of beetle in the family Cerambycidae. It was described by Per Olof Christopher Aurivillius in 1914.

== Subspecies ==
- Mystrocnemis bicolor occidentalis Breuning, 1956
- Mystrocnemis bicolor bicolor Aurivillius, 1914
