= Clavoserixia =

Scientific classification
- Kingdom: Animalia
- Phylum: Arthropoda
- Class: Insecta
- Order: Coleoptera
- Suborder: Polyphaga
- Infraorder: Cucujiformia
- Family: Cerambycidae
- Tribe: Saperdini
- Genus: Clavoserixia; Breuning, 1954
- Species: C. bifasciata

Binomial name
- Clavoserixia bifasciata (Aurivillius, 1913)

Genus of beetles

Clavoserixia is a monotypic beetle genus in the family Cerambycidae described by Stephan von Breuning in 1954. Its single species, Clavoserixia bifasciata, was described by Per Olof Christopher Aurivillius in 1913.
