= Paraserixia flava =

Scientific classification
- Kingdom: Animalia
- Phylum: Arthropoda
- Class: Insecta
- Order: Coleoptera
- Suborder: Polyphaga
- Infraorder: Cucujiformia
- Family: Cerambycidae
- Genus: Paraserixia
- Species: P. flava

Binomial name
- Paraserixia flava Breuning, 1965

Species of beetle

Paraserixia flava is a species of beetle in the family Cerambycidae. It was described by Stephan von Breuning in 1965. It is known from India.
