= Zosne cachita =

Scientific classification
- Domain: Eukaryota
- Kingdom: Animalia
- Phylum: Arthropoda
- Class: Insecta
- Order: Coleoptera
- Suborder: Polyphaga
- Infraorder: Cucujiformia
- Family: Cerambycidae
- Genus: Zosne
- Species: Z. cachita

Binomial name
- Zosne cachita Heller, 1922

Species of beetle

Zosne cachita is a species of longhorn beetle in the tribe Saperdini in the genus Zosne that was discovered by Heller in 1922.
