= Kabylophytoecia =

Scientific classification
- Kingdom: Animalia
- Phylum: Arthropoda
- Class: Insecta
- Order: Coleoptera
- Suborder: Polyphaga
- Infraorder: Cucujiformia
- Family: Cerambycidae
- Tribe: Saperdini
- Genus: Kabylophytoecia; Sama, 2005
- Species: K. cirteensis

Binomial name
- Kabylophytoecia cirteensis (H. Lucas, 1842)

Synonyms
- Phytoecia cirteensis Lucas, 1842; Conizonia cirteensis (Lucas) Villiers, 1946; Tala cirteensis (Lucas) Sama, 2005; Conizonia cirtensis (Lucas) Pic, 1896 (misspelling); Phytoecia cyrtana Lucas, 1849

Genus of beetles

Kabylophytoecia is a monotypic beetle genus in the family Cerambycidae described by Sama in 2005. Its only species, Kabylophytoecia cirteensis, was described by Hippolyte Lucas in 1842.
