= Vespinitocris camerunica =

Scientific classification
- Kingdom: Animalia
- Phylum: Arthropoda
- Class: Insecta
- Order: Coleoptera
- Suborder: Polyphaga
- Infraorder: Cucujiformia
- Family: Cerambycidae
- Genus: Vespinitocris
- Species: V. camerunica

Binomial name
- Vespinitocris camerunica Breuning, 1956

Species of beetle

Vespinitocris camerunica is a species of beetle in the family Cerambycidae. It was described by Stephan von Breuning in 1956. It is known from Cameroon.
