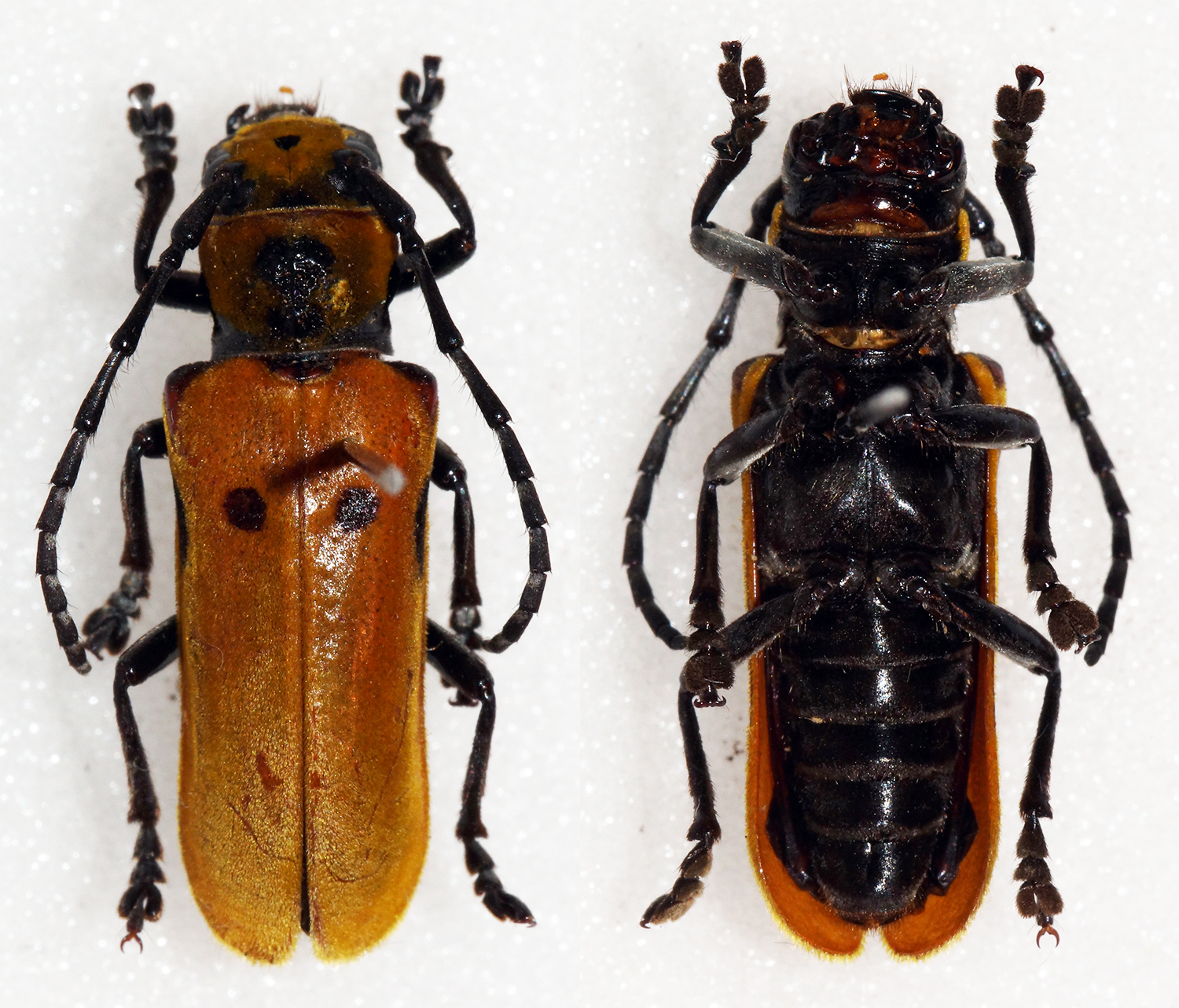

Scientific classification
- Kingdom: Animalia
- Phylum: Arthropoda
- Class: Insecta
- Order: Coleoptera
- Suborder: Polyphaga
- Infraorder: Cucujiformia
- Family: Cerambycidae
- Genus: Mimocagosima
- Species: M. ochreipennis

Binomial name
- Mimocagosima ochreipennis Breuning, 1968

= Mimocagosima ochreipennis =

Species of beetle

Mimocagosima ochreipennis is a species of beetle in the family Cerambycidae. It was described by Stephan von Breuning in 1968. It is known from Laos.
