= Nedytisis =

Scientific classification
- Kingdom: Animalia
- Phylum: Arthropoda
- Class: Insecta
- Order: Coleoptera
- Suborder: Polyphaga
- Infraorder: Cucujiformia
- Family: Cerambycidae
- Tribe: Saperdini
- Genus: Nedytisis

Genus of beetles

Nedytisis is a genus of longhorn beetles of the subfamily Lamiinae, containing the following species:

- Nedytisis fuscoapicalis Breuning, 1950
- Nedytisis obrioides Pascoe, 1866
