= Neoserixia delicata =

Scientific classification
- Kingdom: Animalia
- Phylum: Arthropoda
- Class: Insecta
- Order: Coleoptera
- Suborder: Polyphaga
- Infraorder: Cucujiformia
- Family: Cerambycidae
- Genus: Neoserixia
- Species: N. delicata

Binomial name
- Neoserixia delicata Matsushita, 1933

Species of beetle

Neoserixia delicata is a species of beetle in the family Cerambycidae. It was described by Masaki Matsushita in 1933.
