= Vespinitocris dux =

Scientific classification
- Domain: Eukaryota
- Kingdom: Animalia
- Phylum: Arthropoda
- Class: Insecta
- Order: Coleoptera
- Suborder: Polyphaga
- Infraorder: Cucujiformia
- Family: Cerambycidae
- Genus: Vespinitocris
- Species: V. dux

Binomial name
- Vespinitocris dux (Jordan, 1894)

Species of beetle

Vespinitocris dux is a species of beetle in the family Cerambycidae. It was described by Karl Jordan in 1894. It is known from the Democratic Republic of the Congo and Gabon.
