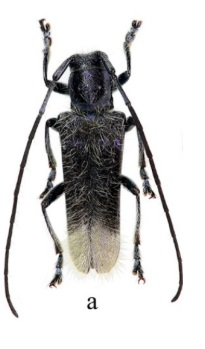

Scientific classification
- Kingdom: Animalia
- Phylum: Arthropoda
- Class: Insecta
- Order: Coleoptera
- Suborder: Polyphaga
- Infraorder: Cucujiformia
- Family: Cerambycidae
- Genus: Malloderma
- Species: M. kuegleri

Binomial name
- Malloderma kuegleri Holzschuh, 2010

= Malloderma kuegleri =

Species of beetle

Malloderma kuegleri is a species of beetle in the family Cerambycidae. It was described by Holzschuh in 2010. It is known from Laos.
