= Dyenmonus =

Scientific classification
- Kingdom: Animalia
- Phylum: Arthropoda
- Class: Insecta
- Order: Coleoptera
- Suborder: Polyphaga
- Infraorder: Cucujiformia
- Family: Cerambycidae
- Subfamily: Lamiinae
- Tribe: Saperdini
- Genus: Dyenmonus; Thomson, 1868

Genus of beetles

Dyenmonus is a genus of longhorn beetles of the subfamily Lamiinae, containing the following species:

subgenus Angoladyenmonus

- Dyenmonus angolanus Breuning, 1956

subgenus Confusodyenmonus

- Dyenmonus confusus Aurivillius, 1908

subgenus Cylindrodyenmonus

- Dyenmonus cristipennis Breuning, 1950
- Dyenmonus cylindricus Jordan, 1894
- Dyenmonus cylindroides Breuning, 1956

subgenus Dyenmonus

- Dyenmonus nuptus Thomson, 1868

subgenus Maculodyenmonus

- Dyenmonus bimaculicollis Breuning, 1956

subgenus Pseudodyenmonus

- Dyenmonus fissilis Aurivillius, 1913

subgenus Vittatodyenmonus

- Dyenmonus nigrifrons Aurivillius, 1914
- Dyenmonus trivittatus Aurivillius, 1914
