= Gleneonupserha elongata =

Scientific classification
- Kingdom: Animalia
- Phylum: Arthropoda
- Class: Insecta
- Order: Coleoptera
- Suborder: Polyphaga
- Infraorder: Cucujiformia
- Family: Cerambycidae
- Genus: Gleneonupserha
- Species: G. elongata

Binomial name
- Gleneonupserha elongata Breuning, 1949

Species of beetle

Gleneonupserha elongata is a species of beetle in the family Cerambycidae. It was described by Stephan von Breuning in 1949.
