= Gleneonupserha vaga =

Scientific classification
- Kingdom: Animalia
- Phylum: Arthropoda
- Class: Insecta
- Order: Coleoptera
- Suborder: Polyphaga
- Infraorder: Cucujiformia
- Family: Cerambycidae
- Genus: Gleneonupserha
- Species: G. vaga

Binomial name
- Gleneonupserha vaga (Gahan, 1909)

Species of beetle

Gleneonupserha vaga is a species of beetle in the family Cerambycidae. It was described by Charles Joseph Gahan in 1909.
