= Ossonis clytomima =

Scientific classification
- Kingdom: Animalia
- Phylum: Arthropoda
- Class: Insecta
- Order: Coleoptera
- Suborder: Polyphaga
- Infraorder: Cucujiformia
- Family: Cerambycidae
- Genus: Ossonis
- Species: O. clytomima

Binomial name
- Ossonis clytomima Pascoe, 1867

Species of beetle

Ossonis clytomima is a species of beetle in the family Cerambycidae. It was described by Francis Polkinghorne Pascoe in 1867. It is known from Malaysia and Borneo. It contains the varietas Ossonis clytomima var. flavotibialis.
