= Vespinitocris ichneumon =

Scientific classification
- Kingdom: Animalia
- Phylum: Arthropoda
- Class: Insecta
- Order: Coleoptera
- Suborder: Polyphaga
- Infraorder: Cucujiformia
- Family: Cerambycidae
- Genus: Vespinitocris
- Species: V. ichneumon

Binomial name
- Vespinitocris ichneumon (Hintz, 1919)

Synonyms
- Vespinitocris ichneumon (Hintz, 1919); Nitocris ichneumon Hintz, 1919

Species of beetle

Vespinitocris ichneumon is a species of beetle in the family Cerambycidae. It was described by Hintz in 1919. It is known from the Democratic Republic of the Congo.

== Varietas ==
- Vespinitocris ichneumon var. vespiformis Breuning, 1950
- Vespinitocris ichneumon var. rufoantennalis Breuning, 1950
