= Menesida carinifrons =

Scientific classification
- Kingdom: Animalia
- Phylum: Arthropoda
- Class: Insecta
- Order: Coleoptera
- Suborder: Polyphaga
- Infraorder: Cucujiformia
- Family: Cerambycidae
- Genus: Menesida
- Species: M. carinifrons

Binomial name
- Menesida carinifrons Aurivillius, 1922

Species of beetle

Menesida carinifrons is a species of beetle in the family Cerambycidae. It was described by Per Olof Christopher Aurivillius in 1922. It is known from Borneo.
