= Parablepisanis =

Scientific classification
- Kingdom: Animalia
- Phylum: Arthropoda
- Class: Insecta
- Order: Coleoptera
- Suborder: Polyphaga
- Infraorder: Cucujiformia
- Family: Cerambycidae
- Tribe: Saperdini
- Genus: Parablepisanis

Genus of beetles

Parablepisanis is a genus of longhorn beetles of the subfamily Lamiinae, containing the following species:

- Parablepisanis feai Breuning, 1950
- Parablepisanis rufa Breuning, 1956
