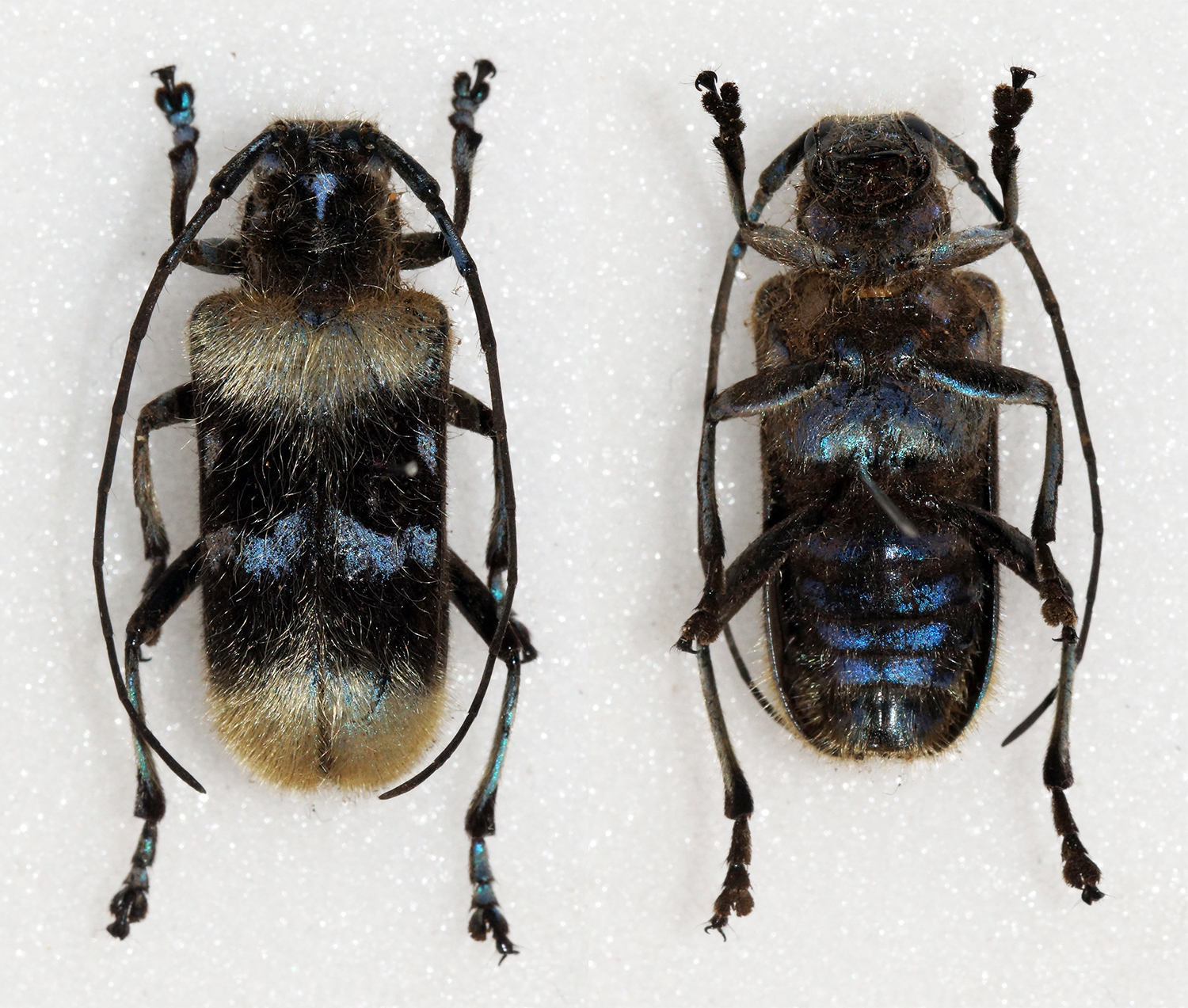
- Malloderma pascoei

Scientific classification
- Kingdom: Animalia
- Phylum: Arthropoda
- Class: Insecta
- Order: Coleoptera
- Suborder: Polyphaga
- Infraorder: Cucujiformia
- Family: Cerambycidae
- Tribe: Saperdini
- Genus: Malloderma; Lacordaire, 1872

= Malloderma =

Genus of beetles

Malloderma is a genus of longhorn beetles of the subfamily Lamiinae, containing the following species:

- Malloderma jianfenglingense (Hua, 1985)
- Malloderma kuegleri Holzschuh, 2010
- Malloderma pascoei Lacordaire, 1872
- Malloderma pulchra (Pic, 1926)
