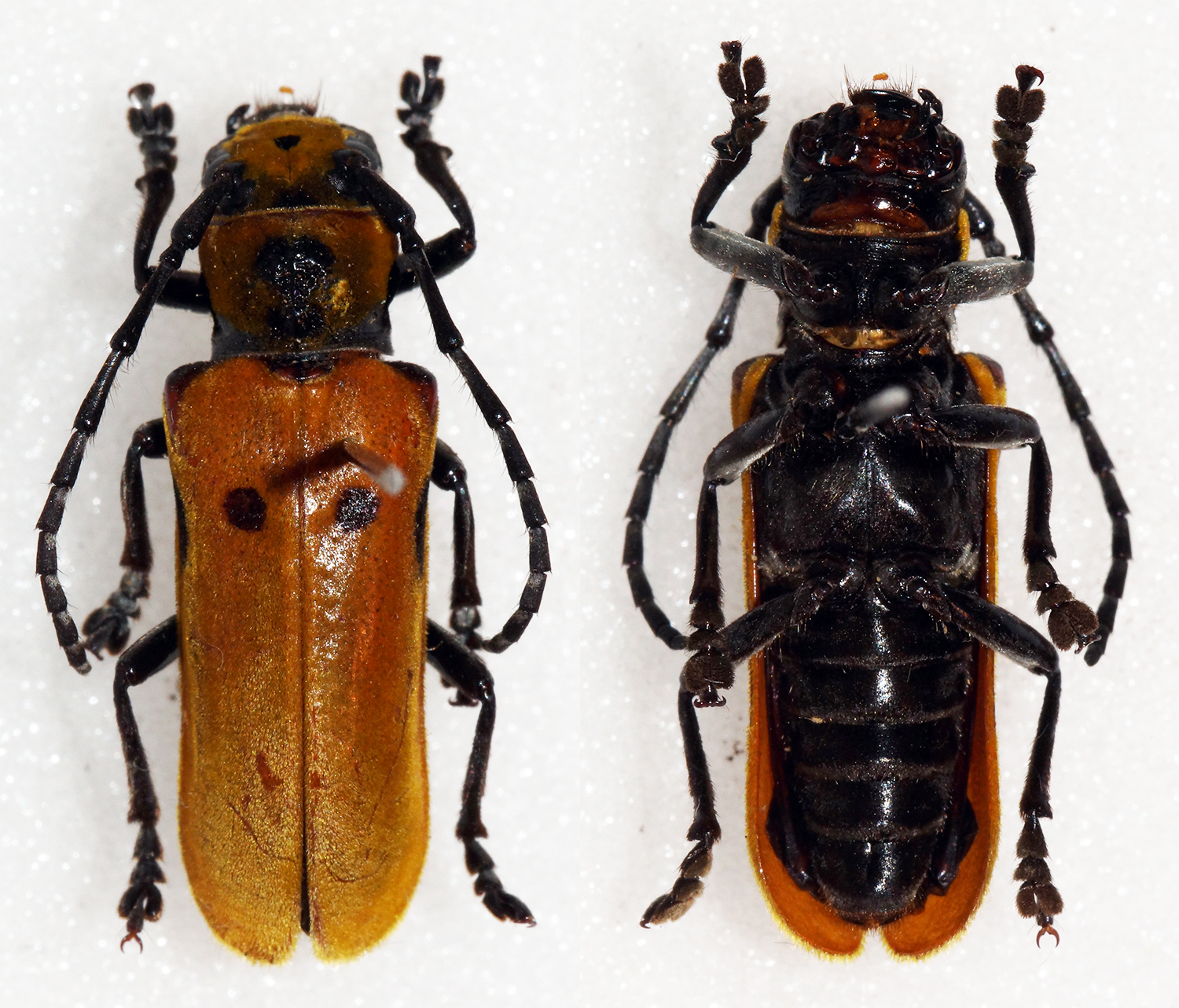
- Mimocagosima ochreipennis

Scientific classification
- Kingdom: Animalia
- Phylum: Arthropoda
- Class: Insecta
- Order: Coleoptera
- Suborder: Polyphaga
- Infraorder: Cucujiformia
- Family: Cerambycidae
- Tribe: Saperdini
- Genus: Mimocagosima

= Mimocagosima =

Genus of beetles

Mimocagosima is a genus of longhorn beetles of the subfamily Lamiinae, containing the following species:

- Mimocagosima humeralis (Gressitt, 1951)
- Mimocagosima ochreipennis Breuning, 1968
