= Schoenionta =

Scientific classification
- Domain: Eukaryota
- Kingdom: Animalia
- Phylum: Arthropoda
- Class: Insecta
- Order: Coleoptera
- Suborder: Polyphaga
- Infraorder: Cucujiformia
- Family: Cerambycidae
- Tribe: Saperdini
- Genus: Schoenionta

Genus of beetles

Schoenionta is a genus of longhorn beetles of the subfamily Lamiinae, containing the following species:

- Schoenionta breuningi Siess, 1974
- Schoenionta dehiscens (Aurivillius, 1911)
- Schoenionta ichneumonoides Breuning, 1954
- Schoenionta javanicola Breuning, 1954
- Schoenionta macilenta (Pascoe, 1867)
- Schoenionta merangensis Breuning, 1954
- Schoenionta necydaloides (Pascoe, 1867)
- Schoenionta philippinica Breuning, 1954
- Schoenionta strigosa (Pascoe, 1867)
- Schoenionta vespiventris Thomson, 1868
