= Mystrocnemis stictica =

Scientific classification
- Domain: Eukaryota
- Kingdom: Animalia
- Phylum: Arthropoda
- Class: Insecta
- Order: Coleoptera
- Suborder: Polyphaga
- Infraorder: Cucujiformia
- Family: Cerambycidae
- Genus: Mystrocnemis
- Species: M. stictica

Binomial name
- Mystrocnemis stictica Aurivillius, 1914

Species of beetle

Mystrocnemis stictica is a species of beetle in the family Cerambycidae. It was described by Per Olof Christopher Aurivillius in 1914.
