= Vespinitocris tavakiliani =

Scientific classification
- Domain: Eukaryota
- Kingdom: Animalia
- Phylum: Arthropoda
- Class: Insecta
- Order: Coleoptera
- Suborder: Polyphaga
- Infraorder: Cucujiformia
- Family: Cerambycidae
- Genus: Vespinitocris
- Species: V. tavakiliani

Binomial name
- Vespinitocris tavakiliani Sudre & Téocchi, 2005

Species of beetle

Vespinitocris tavakiliani is a species of beetle in the family Cerambycidae. It was described by Jérôme Sudre and Pierre Téocchi in 2005. It is known from the Ivory Coast.
