= Schoenionta strigosa =

Scientific classification
- Kingdom: Animalia
- Phylum: Arthropoda
- Class: Insecta
- Order: Coleoptera
- Suborder: Polyphaga
- Infraorder: Cucujiformia
- Family: Cerambycidae
- Genus: Schoenionta
- Species: S. strigosa

Binomial name
- Schoenionta strigosa (Pascoe, 1867)

Synonyms
- Oberea strigosa Pascoe, 1867

Species of beetle

Schoenionta strigosa is a species of beetle in the family Cerambycidae. It was described by Pascoe in 1867. It is known from Sumatra, Borneo and Malaysia.
