= Dyenmonus nuptus =

Scientific classification
- Kingdom: Animalia
- Phylum: Arthropoda
- Class: Insecta
- Order: Coleoptera
- Suborder: Polyphaga
- Infraorder: Cucujiformia
- Family: Cerambycidae
- Genus: Dyenmonus
- Species: D. nuptus

Binomial name
- Dyenmonus nuptus Thomson, 1868

Species of beetle

Dyenmonus nuptus is a species of beetle in the family Cerambycidae. It was described by James Thomson in 1868.
