= Spinoberea subspinosa =

Scientific classification
- Kingdom: Animalia
- Phylum: Arthropoda
- Class: Insecta
- Order: Coleoptera
- Suborder: Polyphaga
- Infraorder: Cucujiformia
- Family: Cerambycidae
- Genus: Spinoberea
- Species: S. subspinosa

Binomial name
- Spinoberea subspinosa Pic, 1922

Species of beetle

Spinoberea subspinosa is a species of beetle in the family Cerambycidae. It was described by Maurice Pic in 1922.
