= Dyenmonus cylindricus =

Scientific classification
- Kingdom: Animalia
- Phylum: Arthropoda
- Class: Insecta
- Order: Coleoptera
- Suborder: Polyphaga
- Infraorder: Cucujiformia
- Family: Cerambycidae
- Genus: Dyenmonus
- Species: D. cylindricus

Binomial name
- Dyenmonus cylindricus Jordan, 1894

Species of beetle

Dyenmonus cylindricus is a species of beetle in the family Cerambycidae. It was described by Karl Jordan in 1894.
