= Schoenionta macilenta =

Scientific classification
- Domain: Eukaryota
- Kingdom: Animalia
- Phylum: Arthropoda
- Class: Insecta
- Order: Coleoptera
- Suborder: Polyphaga
- Infraorder: Cucujiformia
- Family: Cerambycidae
- Genus: Schoenionta
- Species: S. macilenta

Binomial name
- Schoenionta macilenta (Pascoe, 1867)

Species of beetle

Schoenionta macilenta is a species of beetle in the family Cerambycidae. It was described by Francis Polkinghorne Pascoe in 1867.
