= Scytasis sericea =

Scientific classification
- Domain: Eukaryota
- Kingdom: Animalia
- Phylum: Arthropoda
- Class: Insecta
- Order: Coleoptera
- Suborder: Polyphaga
- Infraorder: Cucujiformia
- Family: Cerambycidae
- Genus: Scytasis
- Species: S. sericea

Binomial name
- Scytasis sericea Gardner, 1930

Species of beetle

Scytasis sericea is a species of beetle in the family Cerambycidae. It was described by James Clark Molesworth Gardner in 1930.
