= Dystomorphus =

Scientific classification
- Kingdom: Animalia
- Phylum: Arthropoda
- Class: Insecta
- Order: Coleoptera
- Suborder: Polyphaga
- Infraorder: Cucujiformia
- Family: Cerambycidae
- Subfamily: Lamiinae
- Tribe: Saperdini
- Genus: Dystomorphus; Pic, 1926

Genus of beetles

Dystomorphus is a genus of longhorn beetles of the subfamily Lamiinae.

== Species ==
Dystomorphus contains the following species:

- Dystomorphus diversus Holzschuh & Lin, 2017
- Dystomorphus esakii Hayashi, 1974
- Dystomorphus nigrosignatus Pu, Wang & Li, 1998
- Dystomorphus niisatoi Holzschuh & Lin, 2017
- Dystomorphus notatus Pic, 1926
- Dystomorphus piceae Holzschuh, 2003
- Dystomorphus sichuanensis Yu, 1994
