= Dystomorphus notatus =

Scientific classification
- Kingdom: Animalia
- Phylum: Arthropoda
- Class: Insecta
- Order: Coleoptera
- Suborder: Polyphaga
- Infraorder: Cucujiformia
- Family: Cerambycidae
- Genus: Dystomorphus
- Species: D. notatus

Binomial name
- Dystomorphus notatus Pic, 1926

Species of beetle

Dystomorphus notatus is a species of beetle in the family Cerambycidae. It was described by Maurice Pic in 1926.
