= Scytasis =

Scientific classification
- Domain: Eukaryota
- Kingdom: Animalia
- Phylum: Arthropoda
- Class: Insecta
- Order: Coleoptera
- Suborder: Polyphaga
- Infraorder: Cucujiformia
- Family: Cerambycidae
- Subfamily: Lamiinae
- Tribe: Saperdini
- Genus: Scytasis; Pascoe, 1867

Type species
- Scytasis nitida Pascoe, 1867

Genus of beetles

Scytasis is a genus of longhorn beetles of the subfamily Lamiinae, containing the following species:

- Scytasis nitida Pascoe, 1867
- Scytasis sericea Gardner, 1930
