= Dystomorphus piceae =

Scientific classification
- Domain: Eukaryota
- Kingdom: Animalia
- Phylum: Arthropoda
- Class: Insecta
- Order: Coleoptera
- Suborder: Polyphaga
- Infraorder: Cucujiformia
- Family: Cerambycidae
- Genus: Dystomorphus
- Species: D. piceae

Binomial name
- Dystomorphus piceae Holzschuh, 2003

Species of beetle

Dystomorphus piceae is a species of beetle in the family Cerambycidae. It was described by Holzschuh in 2003.
