= Zosne =

Scientific classification
- Domain: Eukaryota
- Kingdom: Animalia
- Phylum: Arthropoda
- Class: Insecta
- Order: Coleoptera
- Suborder: Polyphaga
- Infraorder: Cucujiformia
- Family: Cerambycidae
- Tribe: Saperdini
- Genus: Zosne; Pascoe, 1866

Synonyms
- Parathyestes Breuning, 1980; Pseudothyestes Breuning, 1980

Genus of beetles

Zosne is a genus of longhorn beetles of the subfamily Lamiinae containing the following species:

- Zosne cachita Heller, 1922
- Zosne cincticornis Pascoe, 1866
- Zosne matangensis Breuning, 1950
