= Chlorisanis viridis =

Scientific classification
- Kingdom: Animalia
- Phylum: Arthropoda
- Class: Insecta
- Order: Coleoptera
- Suborder: Polyphaga
- Infraorder: Cucujiformia
- Family: Cerambycidae
- Genus: Chlorisanis
- Species: C. viridis

Binomial name
- Chlorisanis viridis Pascoe, 1867

Species of beetle

Chlorisanis viridis is a species of beetle in the family Cerambycidae. It was described by Francis Polkinghorne Pascoe in 1867. It is known from Malaysia, Borneo and Java. It contains the varietas Chlorisanis viridis var. violaceosuturalis.
