= Schoenionta dehiscens =

Scientific classification
- Kingdom: Animalia
- Phylum: Arthropoda
- Class: Insecta
- Order: Coleoptera
- Suborder: Polyphaga
- Infraorder: Cucujiformia
- Family: Cerambycidae
- Genus: Schoenionta
- Species: S. dehiscens

Binomial name
- Schoenionta dehiscens (Aurivillius, 1911)

Synonyms
- Oberea dehiscens Aurivillius, 1911

Species of beetle

Schoenionta dehiscens is a species of beetle in the family Cerambycidae. It was described by Per Olof Christopher Aurivillius in 1911. It is known from Borneo.
