= Savang vatthanai =

Scientific classification
- Kingdom: Animalia
- Phylum: Arthropoda
- Class: Insecta
- Order: Coleoptera
- Suborder: Polyphaga
- Infraorder: Cucujiformia
- Family: Cerambycidae
- Genus: Savang
- Species: S. vatthanai

Binomial name
- Savang vatthanai Breuning, 1963

Species of beetle

Savang vatthanai is a species of beetle in the family Cerambycidae. It was described by Stephan von Breuning in 1963.
