= Ossonis hirsutipes =

Scientific classification
- Kingdom: Animalia
- Phylum: Arthropoda
- Class: Insecta
- Order: Coleoptera
- Suborder: Polyphaga
- Infraorder: Cucujiformia
- Family: Cerambycidae
- Genus: Ossonis
- Species: O. hirsutipes

Binomial name
- Ossonis hirsutipes Aurivillius, 1922

Species of beetle

Ossonis hirsutipes is a species of beetle in the family Cerambycidae. It was described by Per Olof Christopher Aurivillius in 1922. The species is native to the island of Borneo (territory split between the countries of Indonesia, Malaysia and Brunei).
