= Menesida planifrons =

Scientific classification
- Domain: Eukaryota
- Kingdom: Animalia
- Phylum: Arthropoda
- Class: Insecta
- Order: Coleoptera
- Suborder: Polyphaga
- Infraorder: Cucujiformia
- Family: Cerambycidae
- Genus: Menesida
- Species: M. planifrons

Binomial name
- Menesida planifrons Tippmann, 1951

Species of beetle

Menesida planifrons is a species of beetle in the family Cerambycidae. It was described by Tippmann in 1951.
