= Glenida nudiceps =

Scientific classification
- Domain: Eukaryota
- Kingdom: Animalia
- Phylum: Arthropoda
- Class: Insecta
- Order: Coleoptera
- Suborder: Polyphaga
- Infraorder: Cucujiformia
- Family: Cerambycidae
- Genus: Glenida
- Species: G. nudiceps

Binomial name
- Glenida nudiceps Holzschuh, 2013

Species of beetle

Glenida nudiceps is a species of beetle in the family Cerambycidae. It was described by Holzschuh in 2013.
