= Ossonis sumatrensis =

Scientific classification
- Kingdom: Animalia
- Phylum: Arthropoda
- Class: Insecta
- Order: Coleoptera
- Suborder: Polyphaga
- Infraorder: Cucujiformia
- Family: Cerambycidae
- Genus: Ossonis
- Species: O. sumatrensis

Binomial name
- Ossonis sumatrensis (Pic, 1936)

Synonyms
- Cryllis sumatrensis Pic, 1936

Species of beetle

Ossonis sumatrensis is a species of beetle in the family Cerambycidae. It was described by Maurice Pic in 1936.
