= Micromandibularia atrimembris =

Scientific classification
- Kingdom: Animalia
- Phylum: Arthropoda
- Class: Insecta
- Order: Coleoptera
- Suborder: Polyphaga
- Infraorder: Cucujiformia
- Family: Cerambycidae
- Genus: Micromandibularia
- Species: M. atrimembris

Binomial name
- Micromandibularia atrimembris (Pic, 1936)

Species of beetle

Micromandibularia atrimembris is a species of beetle in the family Cerambycidae. It was described by Maurice Pic in 1936.
