= Schoenionta breuningi =

Scientific classification
- Domain: Eukaryota
- Kingdom: Animalia
- Phylum: Arthropoda
- Class: Insecta
- Order: Coleoptera
- Suborder: Polyphaga
- Infraorder: Cucujiformia
- Family: Cerambycidae
- Genus: Schoenionta
- Species: S. breuningi

Binomial name
- Schoenionta breuningi Siess, 1974

Species of beetle

Schoenionta breuningi is a species of beetle in the family Cerambycidae. It was described by Siess in 1974.
