= Dyenmonus cylindroides =

Scientific classification
- Kingdom: Animalia
- Phylum: Arthropoda
- Class: Insecta
- Order: Coleoptera
- Suborder: Polyphaga
- Infraorder: Cucujiformia
- Family: Cerambycidae
- Genus: Dyenmonus
- Species: D. cylindroides

Binomial name
- Dyenmonus cylindroides Breuning, 1956

Species of beetle

Dyenmonus cylindroides is a species of beetle in the family Cerambycidae. It was described by Stephan von Breuning in 1956.
