= Pseudonupserha =

Scientific classification
- Kingdom: Animalia
- Phylum: Arthropoda
- Class: Insecta
- Order: Coleoptera
- Suborder: Polyphaga
- Infraorder: Cucujiformia
- Family: Cerambycidae
- Subfamily: Lamiinae
- Tribe: Saperdini
- Genus: Pseudonupserha; Aurivillius, 1914

Genus of beetles

Pseudonupserha is a genus of longhorn beetles of the subfamily Lamiinae, containing the following species:

- Pseudonupserha congoensis Breuning, 1950
- Pseudonupserha flavipennis Breuning, 1967
- Pseudonupserha mediovittata Breuning, 1950
- Pseudonupserha neavei Aurivillius, 1914
- Pseudonupserha wittei Breuning, 1953
