= Mystrocnemis flavovittata =

Scientific classification
- Domain: Eukaryota
- Kingdom: Animalia
- Phylum: Arthropoda
- Class: Insecta
- Order: Coleoptera
- Suborder: Polyphaga
- Infraorder: Cucujiformia
- Family: Cerambycidae
- Genus: Mystrocnemis
- Species: M. flavovittata

Binomial name
- Mystrocnemis flavovittata Quedenfeldt, 1882

Species of beetle

Mystrocnemis flavovittata is a species of beetle in the family Cerambycidae. It was described by Quedenfeldt in 1882. It is known from Angola.
