= Gracilinitocris =

Scientific classification
- Kingdom: Animalia
- Phylum: Arthropoda
- Class: Insecta
- Order: Coleoptera
- Suborder: Polyphaga
- Infraorder: Cucujiformia
- Family: Cerambycidae
- Tribe: Saperdini
- Genus: Gracilinitocris

Genus of beetles

Gracilinitocris is a genus of longhorn beetles of the subfamily Lamiinae, containing the following species:

- Gracilinitocris gracilenta (Kolbe, 1893)
- Gracilinitocris nigrifrons Breuning, 1950
