= Micromandibularia =

Scientific classification
- Kingdom: Animalia
- Phylum: Arthropoda
- Class: Insecta
- Order: Coleoptera
- Suborder: Polyphaga
- Infraorder: Cucujiformia
- Family: Cerambycidae
- Tribe: Saperdini
- Genus: Micromandibularia

Genus of beetles

Micromandibularia is a genus of longhorn beetles of the subfamily Lamiinae, containing the following species:

- Micromandibularia atrimembris (Pic, 1936)
- Micromandibularia rufa Breuning, 1954
- Micromandibularia ruficeps Pic, 1936
