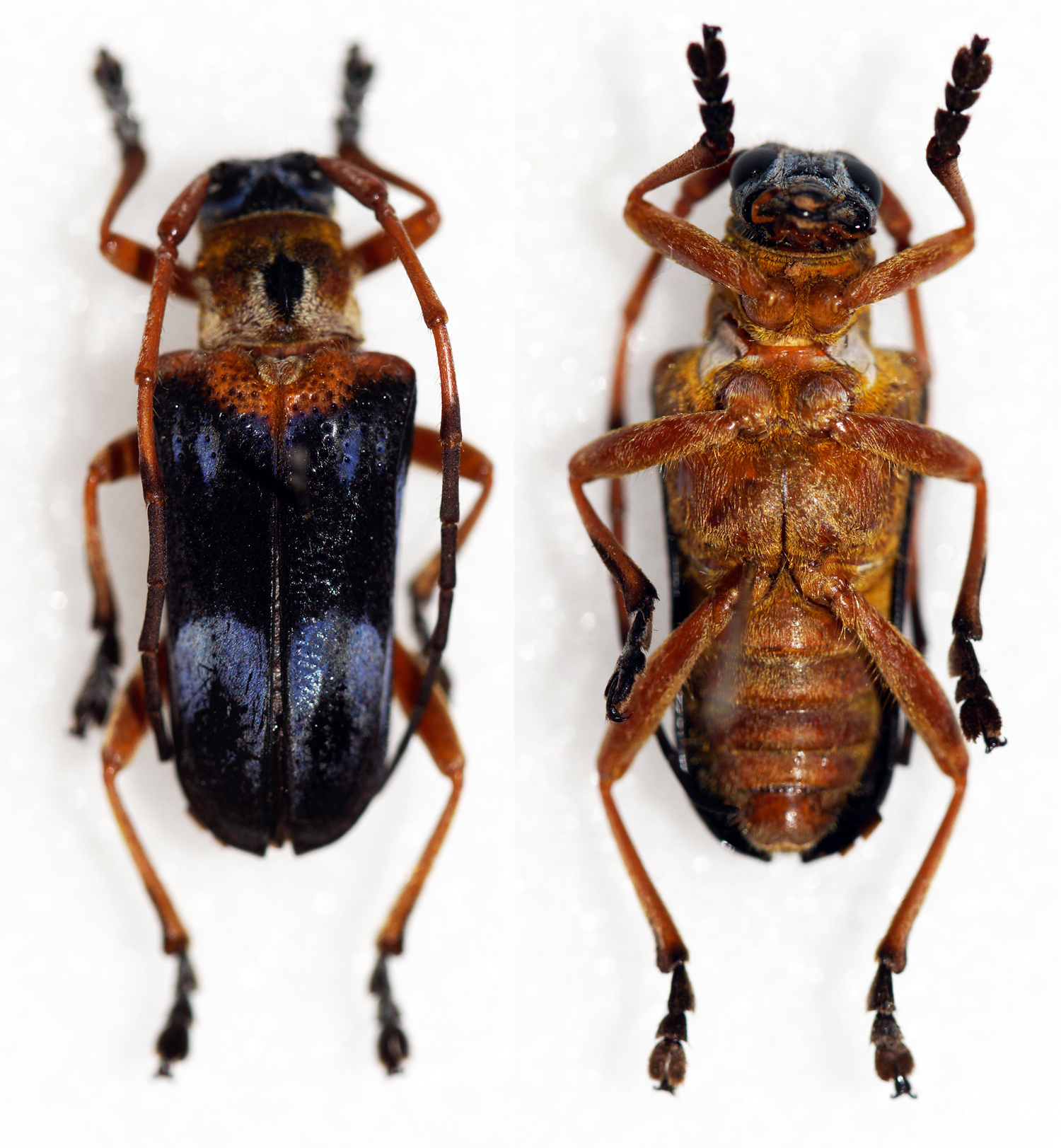
- Glenida puncticollis

Scientific classification
- Domain: Eukaryota
- Kingdom: Animalia
- Phylum: Arthropoda
- Class: Insecta
- Order: Coleoptera
- Suborder: Polyphaga
- Infraorder: Cucujiformia
- Family: Cerambycidae
- Tribe: Saperdini
- Genus: Glenida; Gahan, 1888

= Glenida =

Genus of beetles

Glenida is a genus of longhorn beetles of the subfamily Lamiinae.

== Species ==
Glenida contains the following species:

- Glenida cyaneipennis Gahan, 1888
- Glenida cyaneofasciata Breuning, 1952
- Glenida dauberi Vives & Heffern, 2016
- Glenida izabelae Vives, 2018
- Glenida luteago Holzschuh, 2013
- Glenida nudiceps Holzschuh, 2013
- Glenida puncticollis Breuning, 1961
- Glenida suffusa Gahan, 1888
- Glenida sulphurea Vives & Heffern, 2016
