= Chlorisanis =

Scientific classification
- Kingdom: Animalia
- Phylum: Arthropoda
- Class: Insecta
- Order: Coleoptera
- Suborder: Polyphaga
- Infraorder: Cucujiformia
- Family: Cerambycidae
- Tribe: Saperdini
- Genus: Chlorisanis

Genus of beetles

Chlorisanis is a genus of longhorn beetles of the subfamily Lamiinae, containing the following species:

- Chlorisanis basirufofemoralis Breuning, 1957
- Chlorisanis viridis Pascoe, 1867
