= Scytasis nitida =

Scientific classification
- Kingdom: Animalia
- Phylum: Arthropoda
- Clade: Pancrustacea
- Class: Insecta
- Order: Coleoptera
- Suborder: Polyphaga
- Infraorder: Cucujiformia
- Family: Cerambycidae
- Genus: Scytasis
- Species: S. nitida

Binomial name
- Scytasis nitida Pascoe, 1867

Species of beetle

Scytasis nitida is a species of beetle in the family Cerambycidae. It was described by Francis Polkinghorne Pascoe in 1867. It is known from Sumatra and Borneo. It contains the varietas Scytasis nitida var. anticerufa.
