= Neoserixia pulchra =

Scientific classification
- Kingdom: Animalia
- Phylum: Arthropoda
- Class: Insecta
- Order: Coleoptera
- Suborder: Polyphaga
- Infraorder: Cucujiformia
- Family: Cerambycidae
- Genus: Neoserixia
- Species: N. pulchra

Binomial name
- Neoserixia pulchra Schwarzer, 1925

Species of beetle

Neoserixia pulchra is a species of beetle in the family Cerambycidae. It was described by Bernhard Schwarzer in 1925.
