= Pseudoconizonia =

Scientific classification
- Kingdom: Animalia
- Phylum: Arthropoda
- Class: Insecta
- Order: Coleoptera
- Suborder: Polyphaga
- Infraorder: Cucujiformia
- Family: Cerambycidae
- Genus: Pseudoconizonia
- Species: P. basalis

Binomial name
- Pseudoconizonia basalis (Gahan, 1890)

Genus of beetles

Pseudoconizonia basalis is a species of beetle in the family Cerambycidae, and the only species in the genus Pseudoconizonia. It was described by Gahan in 1890.
