= Elongatoserixia =

Scientific classification
- Kingdom: Animalia
- Phylum: Arthropoda
- Class: Insecta
- Order: Coleoptera
- Suborder: Polyphaga
- Infraorder: Cucujiformia
- Family: Cerambycidae
- Genus: Elongatoserixia
- Species: E. flavosuturalis

Binomial name
- Elongatoserixia flavosuturalis Breuning, 1982

Genus of beetles

Elongatoserixia flavosuturalis is a species of beetle in the family Cerambycidae, and the only species in the genus Elongatoserixia. It was described by Stephan von Breuning in 1982.
