= Trichonitocris =

Scientific classification
- Kingdom: Animalia
- Phylum: Arthropoda
- Class: Insecta
- Order: Coleoptera
- Suborder: Polyphaga
- Infraorder: Cucujiformia
- Family: Cerambycidae
- Genus: Trichonitocris
- Species: T. tibialis

Binomial name
- Trichonitocris tibialis Breuning, 1961

Genus of beetles

Trichonitocris tibialis is a species of beetle in the family Cerambycidae, and the only species in the genus Trichonitocris. It was described by Stephan von Breuning in 1961.
