= Cagosima =

Scientific classification
- Kingdom: Animalia
- Phylum: Arthropoda
- Class: Insecta
- Order: Coleoptera
- Suborder: Polyphaga
- Infraorder: Cucujiformia
- Family: Cerambycidae
- Genus: Cagosima
- Species: C. sanguinolenta

Binomial name
- Cagosima sanguinolenta Thomson, 1864

Genus of beetles

Cagosima sanguinolenta is a species of beetle in the family Cerambycidae, and the only species in the genus Cagosima. It was described by Thomson in 1864.
