= Callundine =

Scientific classification
- Kingdom: Animalia
- Phylum: Arthropoda
- Class: Insecta
- Order: Coleoptera
- Suborder: Polyphaga
- Infraorder: Cucujiformia
- Family: Cerambycidae
- Genus: Callundine
- Species: C. lacordairei

Binomial name
- Callundine lacordairei Thomson, 1879

Synonyms
- Pseudosaperda goliath Pic, 1903

Genus of beetles

Callundine lacordairei is a species of longhorn beetle in the subfamily Lamiinae, and the only species in the genus Callundine. It was described by Thomson in 1879. It is endemic to India.
