= Cristoberea =

Scientific classification
- Kingdom: Animalia
- Phylum: Arthropoda
- Class: Insecta
- Order: Coleoptera
- Suborder: Polyphaga
- Infraorder: Cucujiformia
- Family: Cerambycidae
- Genus: Cristoberea
- Species: C. assamensis

Binomial name
- Cristoberea assamensis Breuning, 1954

Genus of beetles

Cristoberea assamensis is a species of longhorn beetle in the subfamily Lamiinae, and the only species in the genus Cristoberea. It was described by Stephan von Breuning in 1954 and is endemic to India.
