= Serixiophytoecia =

Scientific classification
- Kingdom: Animalia
- Phylum: Arthropoda
- Class: Insecta
- Order: Coleoptera
- Suborder: Polyphaga
- Infraorder: Cucujiformia
- Family: Cerambycidae
- Genus: Serixiophytoecia
- Species: S. vitticollis

Binomial name
- Serixiophytoecia vitticollis Breuning, 1950

Genus of beetles

Serixiophytoecia vitticollis is a species of beetle in the family Cerambycidae, and the only species in the genus Serixiophytoecia. It was described by Stephan von Breuning in 1950.
