= Neoserixia =

Scientific classification
- Kingdom: Animalia
- Phylum: Arthropoda
- Class: Insecta
- Order: Coleoptera
- Suborder: Polyphaga
- Infraorder: Cucujiformia
- Family: Cerambycidae
- Subfamily: Lamiinae
- Tribe: Saperdini
- Genus: Neoserixia; Schwarzer, 1925

Genus of beetles

Neoserixia is a genus of longhorn beetles in the subfamily Lamiinae.

== Species ==
| Binomial | Authority | Year |
|---|---|---|
Subgenus Neopraolia
| Neoserixia delicata | Matsushita | 1933 |
Subgenus Neoserixia
| Neoserixia longicollis | Gressitt | 1925 |
| Neoserixia pulchra | Schwarzer | 1925 |
| Neoserixia schwarzeri | Gressitt | 1935 |
