= Pardaloberea =

Scientific classification
- Kingdom: Animalia
- Phylum: Arthropoda
- Class: Insecta
- Order: Coleoptera
- Suborder: Polyphaga
- Infraorder: Cucujiformia
- Family: Cerambycidae
- Genus: Pardaloberea
- Species: P. curvaticeps

Binomial name
- Pardaloberea curvaticeps Pic, 1926

Genus of beetles

Pardaloberea curvaticeps is a species of beetle in the family Cerambycidae, and the only species in the genus Pardaloberea. It was described by Maurice Pic in 1926.
