= Striophytoecia =

Scientific classification
- Kingdom: Animalia
- Phylum: Arthropoda
- Class: Insecta
- Order: Coleoptera
- Suborder: Polyphaga
- Infraorder: Cucujiformia
- Family: Cerambycidae
- Genus: Striophytoecia
- Species: S. mirei

Binomial name
- Striophytoecia mirei Breuning, 1969

Genus of beetles

Striophytoecia mirei is a species of longhorn beetle in the subfamily Lamiinae, and the only species in the genus Striophytoecia. It was described by Stephan von Breuning in 1969. The species is 2 millimetres (0.079 in) long.
