= Neoxantha =

Scientific classification
- Kingdom: Animalia
- Phylum: Arthropoda
- Class: Insecta
- Order: Coleoptera
- Suborder: Polyphaga
- Infraorder: Cucujiformia
- Family: Cerambycidae
- Genus: Neoxantha
- Species: N. amicta

Binomial name
- Neoxantha amicta Pascoe, 1856

Genus of beetles

Neoxantha amicta is a species of beetle in the family Cerambycidae, and the only species in the genus Neoxantha. It was described by Pascoe in 1856.
