= Saperda bilabilis =

Scientific classification
- Kingdom: Animalia
- Phylum: Arthropoda
- Class: Insecta
- Order: Coleoptera
- Suborder: Polyphaga
- Infraorder: Cucujiformia
- Family: Cerambycidae
- Genus: Saperda
- Species: S. bilabilis

Binomial name
- Saperda bilabilis Newman, 1850

Species of beetle

Saperda bilabilis is a species of beetle in the family Cerambycidae. It was described by Newman in 1850.
