= Cyaneophytoecia =

Scientific classification
- Kingdom: Animalia
- Phylum: Arthropoda
- Class: Insecta
- Order: Coleoptera
- Suborder: Polyphaga
- Infraorder: Cucujiformia
- Family: Cerambycidae
- Genus: Cyaneophytoecia
- Species: C. sospita

Binomial name
- Cyaneophytoecia sospita (Pascoe, 1867)

Genus of beetles

Cyaneophytoecia sospita is a species of beetle in the family Cerambycidae, and the only species in the genus Cyaneophytoecia. It was described by Pascoe in 1867.
