= Parobereopsis =

Scientific classification
- Kingdom: Animalia
- Phylum: Arthropoda
- Class: Insecta
- Order: Coleoptera
- Suborder: Polyphaga
- Infraorder: Cucujiformia
- Family: Cerambycidae
- Genus: Parobereopsis
- Species: P. nigrosternalis

Binomial name
- Parobereopsis nigrosternalis Breuning, 1956

Genus of beetles

Parobereopsis nigrosternalis is a species of beetle in the family Cerambycidae and the only species in the genus Parobereopsis. It was described by Stephan von Breuning in 1956.
