= Bifidunguiglenea =

Scientific classification
- Kingdom: Animalia
- Phylum: Arthropoda
- Class: Insecta
- Order: Coleoptera
- Suborder: Polyphaga
- Infraorder: Cucujiformia
- Family: Cerambycidae
- Genus: Bifidunguiglenea
- Species: B. gestroi

Binomial name
- Bifidunguiglenea gestroi (Gahan, 1895)

Genus of beetles

Bifidunguiglenea gestroi is a species of beetle in the family Cerambycidae, and the only species in the genus Bifidunguiglenea. It was described by Gahan in 1895.
