= Pseudochlorisanis =

Scientific classification
- Kingdom: Animalia
- Phylum: Arthropoda
- Class: Insecta
- Order: Coleoptera
- Suborder: Polyphaga
- Infraorder: Cucujiformia
- Family: Cerambycidae
- Genus: Pseudochlorisanis
- Species: P. similis

Binomial name
- Pseudochlorisanis similis (Gahan, 1907)

Genus of beetles

Pseudochlorisanis similis is a species of beetle in the family Cerambycidae, and the only species in the genus Pseudochlorisanis. It was described by Gahan in 1907.
