= Pseudoglenea =

Scientific classification
- Kingdom: Animalia
- Phylum: Arthropoda
- Class: Insecta
- Order: Coleoptera
- Suborder: Polyphaga
- Infraorder: Cucujiformia
- Family: Cerambycidae
- Genus: Pseudoglenea
- Species: P. densepuncticollis

Binomial name
- Pseudoglenea densepuncticollis Gilmour & Breuning, 1963

Genus of beetles

Pseudoglenea densepuncticollis is a species of beetle in the family Cerambycidae, and the only species in the genus Pseudoglenea. It was described by Gilmour and Stephan von Breuning in 1963.
