= Cachito (disambiguation) =

A cachito is a Venezuelan ham filled croissant.

Cachito may also refer to:

- "Cachito" (Nat King Cole song), 1958
- Cachito (film), 1995 road movie
- "Cachito" (Maná song), 2000
- "Dame un cachito pa' huelé", 1946 song by Arsenio Rodríguez
