= Metallonupserha =

Scientific classification
- Kingdom: Animalia
- Phylum: Arthropoda
- Class: Insecta
- Order: Coleoptera
- Suborder: Polyphaga
- Infraorder: Cucujiformia
- Family: Cerambycidae
- Genus: Metallonupserha
- Species: M. metallescens

Binomial name
- Metallonupserha metallescens Breuning, 1980

Genus of beetles

Metallonupserha metallescens is a species of beetle in the family Cerambycidae, and the only species in the genus Metallonupserha. It was described by Stephan von Breuning in 1980.
