= Mandibularia =

Scientific classification
- Kingdom: Animalia
- Phylum: Arthropoda
- Class: Insecta
- Order: Coleoptera
- Suborder: Polyphaga
- Infraorder: Cucujiformia
- Family: Cerambycidae
- Tribe: Saperdini
- Genus: Mandibularia; Pic, 1925
- Species: M. nigriceps

Binomial name
- Mandibularia nigriceps Pic, 1925

Genus of beetles

Mandibularia is a genus of longhorned beetles in the family Cerambycidae. This genus has a single species, Mandibularia nigriceps, found in China and Southeast Asia.
