= Loboberea =

Scientific classification
- Kingdom: Animalia
- Phylum: Arthropoda
- Class: Insecta
- Order: Coleoptera
- Suborder: Polyphaga
- Infraorder: Cucujiformia
- Family: Cerambycidae
- Genus: Loboberea
- Species: L. pygidialis

Binomial name
- Loboberea pygidialis (Gahan, 1907)

Genus of beetles

Loboberea pygidialis is a species of beetle in the family Cerambycidae, and the only species in the genus Loboberea. It was described by Gahan in 1907.
