= Saperdoglenea =

Scientific classification
- Kingdom: Animalia
- Phylum: Arthropoda
- Class: Insecta
- Order: Coleoptera
- Suborder: Polyphaga
- Infraorder: Cucujiformia
- Family: Cerambycidae
- Genus: Saperdoglenea
- Species: S. gleneoides

Binomial name
- Saperdoglenea gleneoides Breuning, 1964

Genus of beetles

Saperdoglenea gleneoides is a species of beetle in the family Cerambycidae, and the only species in the genus Saperdoglenea. It was described by Stephan von Breuning, in 1964.
