= Mallosiola =

Scientific classification
- Kingdom: Animalia
- Phylum: Arthropoda
- Clade: Pancrustacea
- Class: Insecta
- Order: Coleoptera
- Suborder: Polyphaga
- Infraorder: Cucujiformia
- Family: Cerambycidae
- Genus: Mallosiola
- Species: M. regina

Binomial name
- Mallosiola regina (Heyden, 1887)

Genus of beetles

Mallosiola regina is a species of beetle in the family Cerambycidae, and the only species in the genus Mallosiola. It was described by Heyden in 1887.
