= Paramallosia =

Scientific classification
- Kingdom: Animalia
- Phylum: Arthropoda
- Class: Insecta
- Order: Coleoptera
- Suborder: Polyphaga
- Infraorder: Cucujiformia
- Family: Cerambycidae
- Genus: Paramallosia
- Species: P. afghanica

Binomial name
- Paramallosia afghanica E. Fuchs, 1955

Genus of beetles

Paramallosia is a monotypic beetle genus in the family Cerambycidae described by Ernst Fuchs in 1955. Its only species, Paramallosia afghanica, was described by the same author in the same year.
