= Saperda mellancholica =

Scientific classification
- Kingdom: Animalia
- Phylum: Arthropoda
- Class: Insecta
- Order: Coleoptera
- Suborder: Polyphaga
- Infraorder: Cucujiformia
- Family: Cerambycidae
- Genus: Saperda
- Species: S. mellancholica

Binomial name
- Saperda mellancholica Montrouzier, 1855

Species of beetle

Saperda mellancholica is a species of beetle in the family Cerambycidae. It was described by Xavier Montrouzier in 1855.
