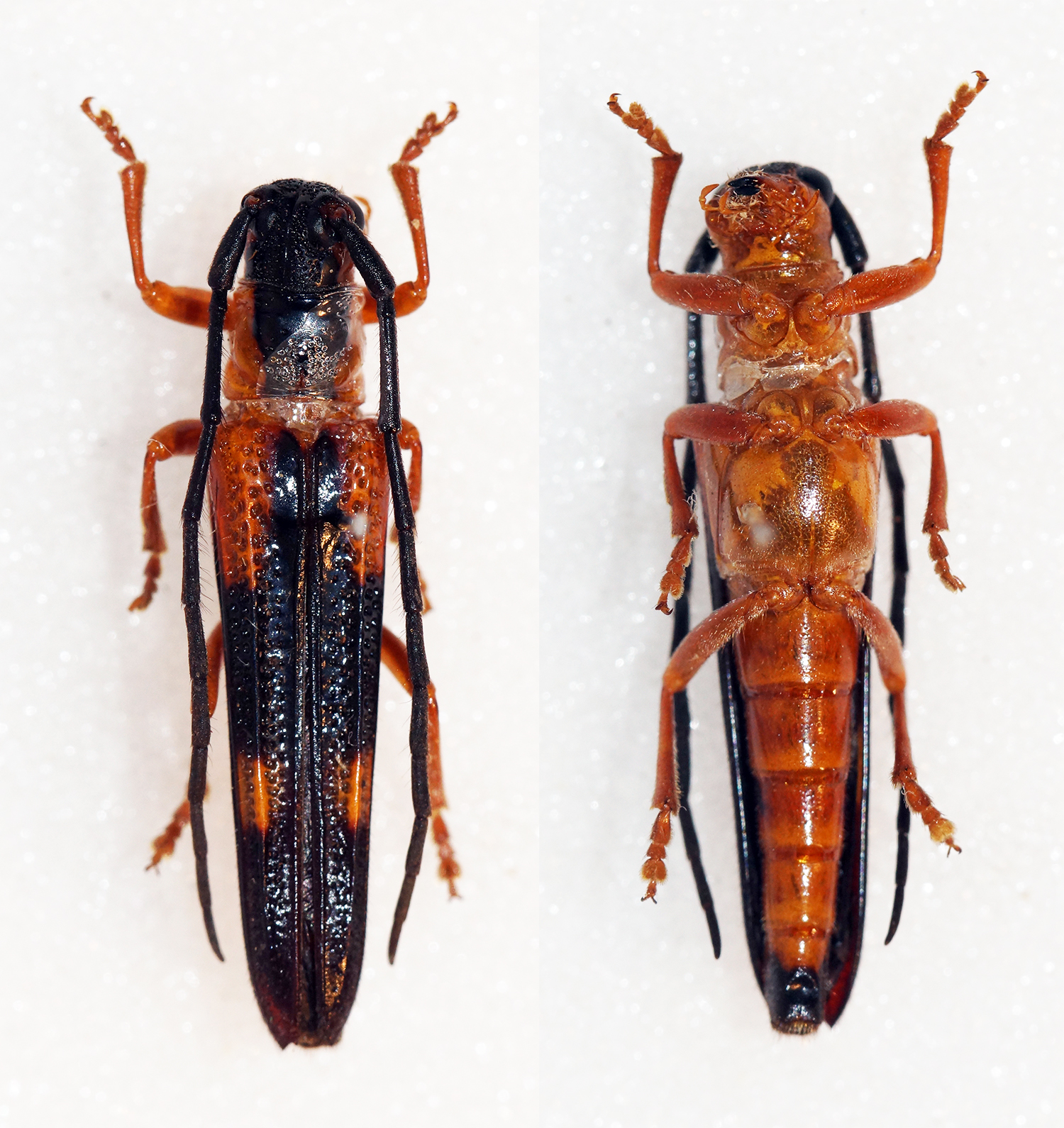

Scientific classification
- Kingdom: Animalia
- Phylum: Arthropoda
- Clade: Pancrustacea
- Class: Insecta
- Order: Coleoptera
- Suborder: Polyphaga
- Infraorder: Cucujiformia
- Family: Cerambycidae
- Genus: Poecilobactris; Kolbe, 1898
- Species: P. militaris

Binomial name
- Poecilobactris militaris (Fairmaire, 1887)

Synonyms
- Volumnia militaris Fairmaire, 1887; Nupserha Kirki Gahan, 1890

= Poecilobactris =

Genus of beetles

Poecilobactris is a monotypic genus of beetles in the family Cerambycidae. The sole species is Poecilobactris militaris. It is known from Tanzania and Kenya.

Poecilobactris militaris measure 15–22 mm (0.59–0.87 in).
