= Oberea gracilis =

Scientific classification
- Domain: Eukaryota
- Kingdom: Animalia
- Phylum: Arthropoda
- Class: Insecta
- Order: Coleoptera
- Suborder: Polyphaga
- Infraorder: Cucujiformia
- Family: Cerambycidae
- Genus: Oberea
- Species: O. gracilis

Binomial name
- Oberea gracilis (Fabricius, 1801)

Synonyms
- Saperda gracilis Fabricius, 1801

Species of beetle

Oberea gracilis is a species of beetle in the family Cerambycidae. It was described by Johan Christian Fabricius in 1801, originally under the genus Saperda. It is known from North America.
