= Phytoecia humeralis =

Scientific classification
- Domain: Eukaryota
- Kingdom: Animalia
- Phylum: Arthropoda
- Class: Insecta
- Order: Coleoptera
- Suborder: Polyphaga
- Infraorder: Cucujiformia
- Family: Cerambycidae
- Genus: Phytoecia
- Species: P. humeralis

Binomial name
- Phytoecia humeralis (Waltl, 1838)

Synonyms
- Phytoecia scapularis Chevrolat, 1882; Helladia humeralis (Waltl, 1838); Saperda humeralis Waltl, 1838

Species of beetle

Phytoecia humeralis is a species of beetle in the family Cerambycidae. It was described by Waltl in 1838, originally under the genus Saperda. It is known from Palestine, Greece, Georgia, Iran, Azerbaijan, Syria, Cyprus, and Turkey. It feeds on Silybum marianum.

== Varietas ==
- Phytoecia humeralis var. mersinensis (Pic, 1900)
- Phytoecia humeralis var. frontalis Chevrolat, 1882
- Phytoecia humeralis var. scapulata Mulsant, 1851
