= Oberea ruficollis =

Scientific classification
- Kingdom: Animalia
- Phylum: Arthropoda
- Clade: Pancrustacea
- Class: Insecta
- Order: Coleoptera
- Suborder: Polyphaga
- Infraorder: Cucujiformia
- Family: Cerambycidae
- Genus: Oberea
- Species: O. ruficollis

Binomial name
- Oberea ruficollis (Fabricius, 1792)

Synonyms
- Saperda ruficollis Fabricius, 1792; Saperda bicolor Megerle, 1804 nec Olivier, 1795

Species of beetle

Oberea ruficollis is a species of beetle in the family Cerambycidae. It was described by Johan Christian Fabricius in 1792, originally under the genus Saperda. It is known from the United States.
