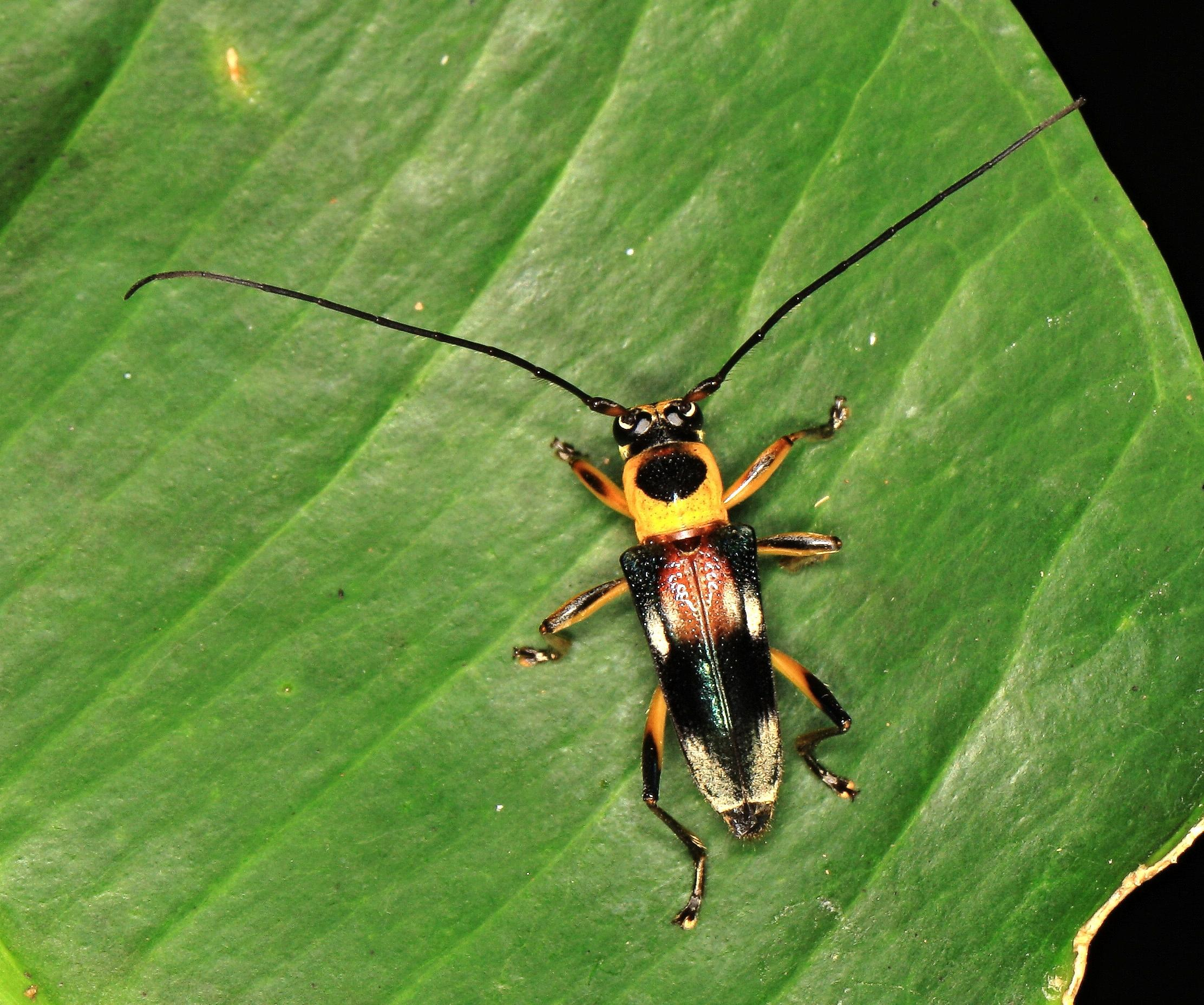

Scientific classification
- Kingdom: Animalia
- Phylum: Arthropoda
- Clade: Pancrustacea
- Class: Insecta
- Order: Coleoptera
- Suborder: Polyphaga
- Infraorder: Cucujiformia
- Family: Cerambycidae
- Genus: Glenea
- Species: G. lefebvrei

Binomial name
- Glenea lefebvrei (Guérin-Méneville, 1831)

Synonyms
- Glenea antica Thomson, 1860; Saperda festiva Boisduval, 1835; Saperda lefebvrei Guérin-Méneville, 1831

= Glenea lefebvrei =

Species of beetle

Glenea lefebvrei is a species of beetle in the family Cerambycidae. It was described by Félix Édouard Guérin-Méneville in 1831, originally under the genus Saperda. It is known from Papua New Guinea and Indonesia.

== Varieties ==
- Glenea lefebvrei var. submedia Thomson, 1860
- Glenea lefebvrei var. violaceipennis Breuning, 1950
