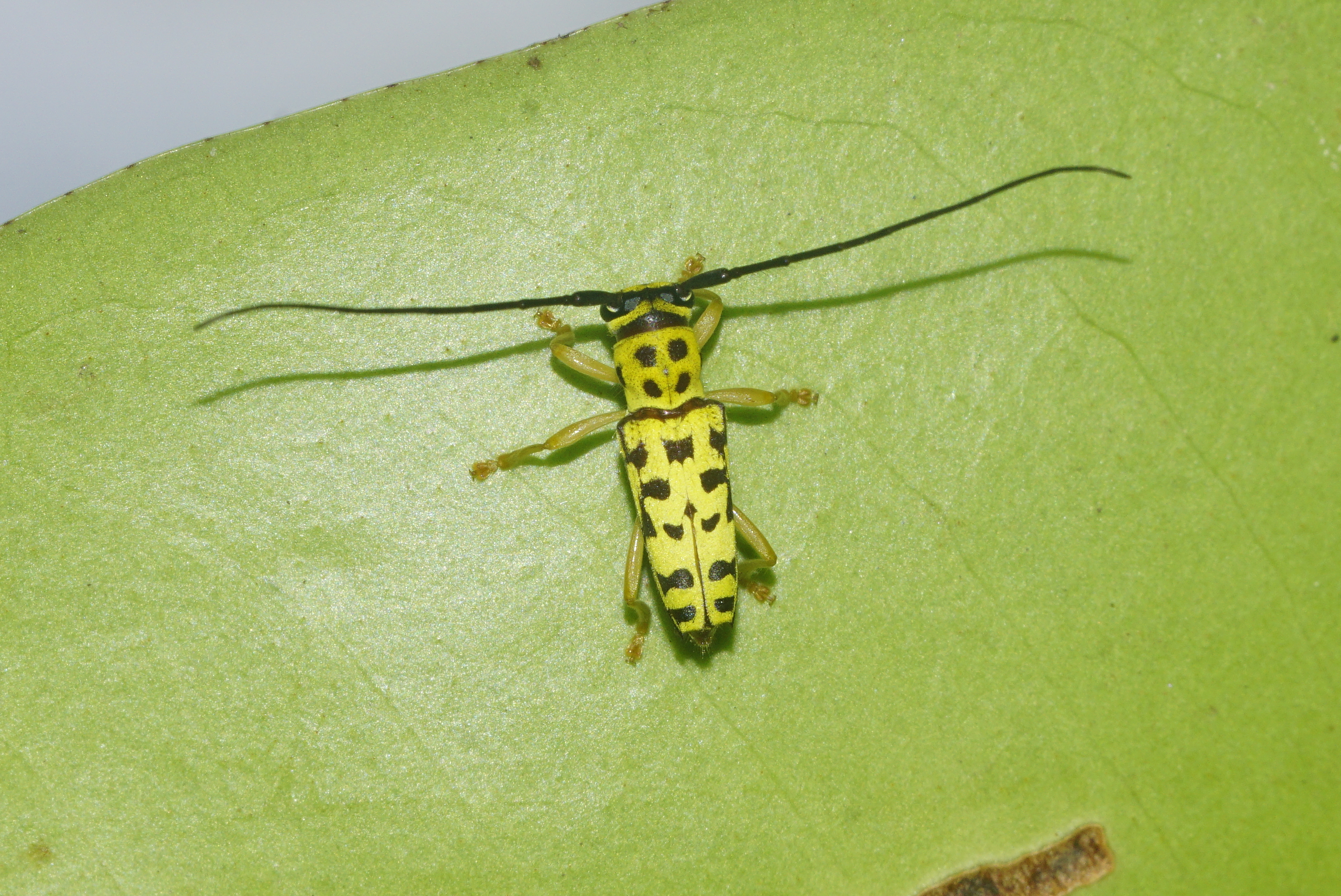

Scientific classification
- Kingdom: Animalia
- Phylum: Arthropoda
- Clade: Pancrustacea
- Class: Insecta
- Order: Coleoptera
- Suborder: Polyphaga
- Infraorder: Cucujiformia
- Family: Cerambycidae
- Genus: Glenea
- Species: G. multiguttata

Binomial name
- Glenea multiguttata (Guérin-Méneville, 1843)

Synonyms
- Glenea maculifera Thomson, 1865; Saperda multiguttata Guérin-Méneville, 1843

= Glenea multiguttata =

Species of beetle

Glenea multiguttata is a species of beetle in the family Cerambycidae. It was described by Félix Édouard Guérin-Méneville in 1843, originally under the genus Saperda. It is known from India. It feeds on Mangifera indica.
