= Oxylia argentata =

Scientific classification
- Kingdom: Animalia
- Phylum: Arthropoda
- Clade: Pancrustacea
- Class: Insecta
- Order: Coleoptera
- Suborder: Polyphaga
- Infraorder: Cucujiformia
- Family: Cerambycidae
- Genus: Oxylia
- Species: O. argentata

Binomial name
- Oxylia argentata (Ménétries, 1832)

Synonyms
- Saperda argentata Ménétries, 1832; Oxylia duponcheli argentata (Ménétries) Heyrovsky, 1943

Species of beetle

Oxylia argentata is a species of beetle in the family Cerambycidae. It was described by Édouard Ménétries in 1832, originally under the genus Saperda. It is known from Israel, Ukraine, Iraq, Turkey, Armenia, and Syria.

== Subspecies ==
- Oxylia argentata languida (Ménétries, 1838)
- Oxylia argentata argentata (Ménétries, 1832)
