= Saperda inornata =

Scientific classification
- Domain: Eukaryota
- Kingdom: Animalia
- Phylum: Arthropoda
- Class: Insecta
- Order: Coleoptera
- Suborder: Polyphaga
- Infraorder: Cucujiformia
- Family: Cerambycidae
- Genus: Saperda
- Species: S. inornata

Binomial name
- Saperda inornata Say, 1824

Synonyms
- Saperda concolor LeConte, 1852; Mecas inornata (Say, 1824)

Species of beetle

Saperda inornata is a species of beetle in the family Cerambycidae. It was described by Thomas Say in 1824. It is known from Canada and the United States. It feeds on Populus tremuloides.

== Subspecies ==
- Saperda inornata unicolor Felt & Joutel, 1904
- Saperda inornata inornata Say, 1824
