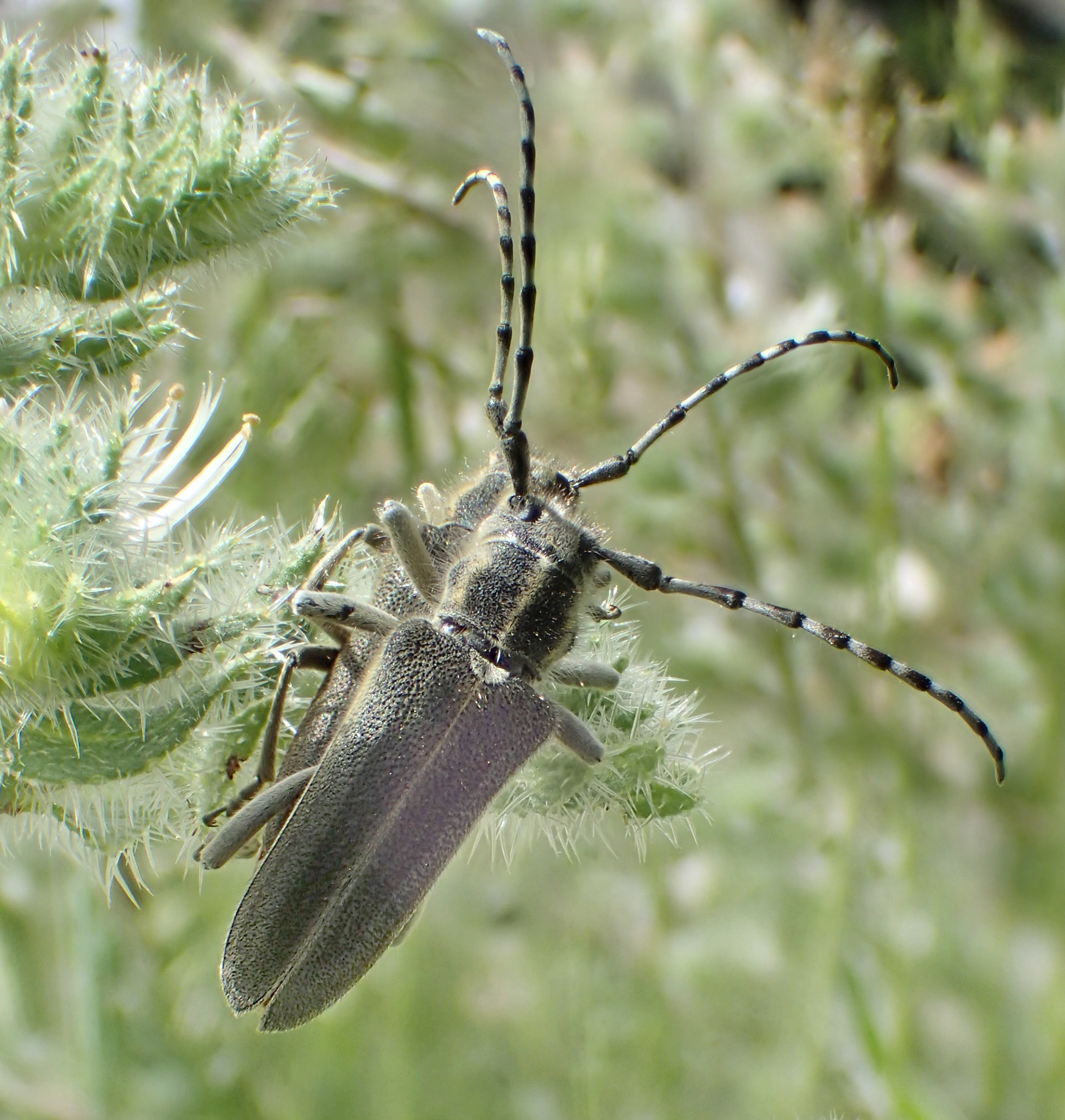

Scientific classification
- Kingdom: Animalia
- Phylum: Arthropoda
- Class: Insecta
- Order: Coleoptera
- Suborder: Polyphaga
- Infraorder: Cucujiformia
- Family: Cerambycidae
- Genus: Oxylia
- Species: O. duponcheli

Binomial name
- Oxylia duponcheli (Brullé, 1833)

Synonyms
- Saperda duponcheli Brullé, 1833; Saperda atomaria Frivaldsky, 1837 nec Townsend, 1797; Mallosia duponcheli (Brullé) Mulsant, 1863; Phytoecia vestita Küster, 1848; Oxylia duponchelii (Brullé, 1833)

= Oxylia duponcheli =

Species of beetle

Oxylia duponcheli is a species of beetle in the family Cerambycidae. It was described by Brullé in 1833, originally under the genus Saperda. It is known from Greece, Bulgaria, Albania, and North Macedonia.
