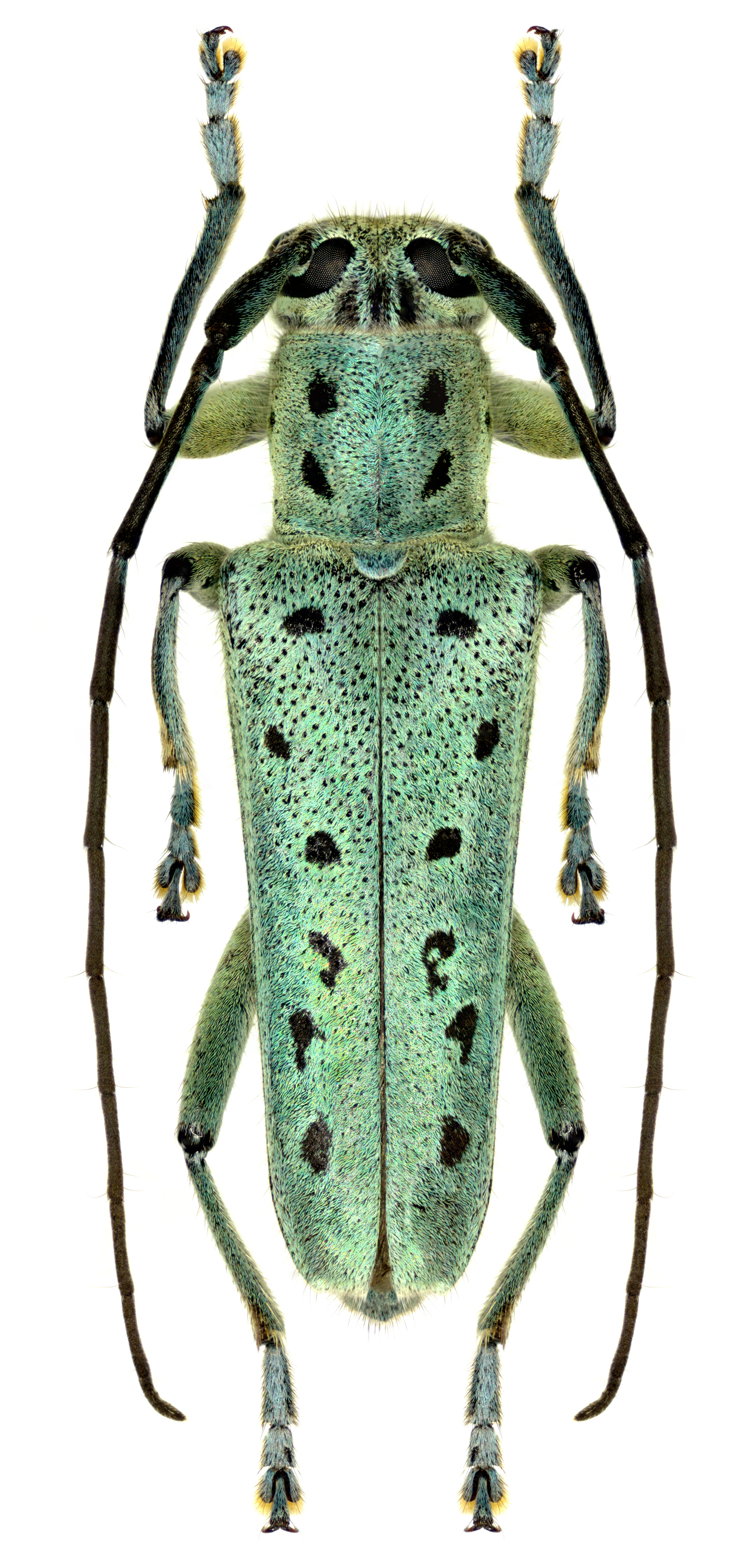
- Saperda punctata male

Scientific classification
- Kingdom: Animalia
- Phylum: Arthropoda
- Class: Insecta
- Order: Coleoptera
- Suborder: Polyphaga
- Infraorder: Cucujiformia
- Family: Cerambycidae
- Genus: Saperda
- Species: S. punctata

Binomial name
- Saperda punctata (Linnaeus, 1767)

Synonyms
- Cerambyx punctatus Linnaeus, 1767; Lopezcolonia punctata (Linnaeus) Alonso-Zarazaga, 1998

= Saperda punctata =

Species of beetle

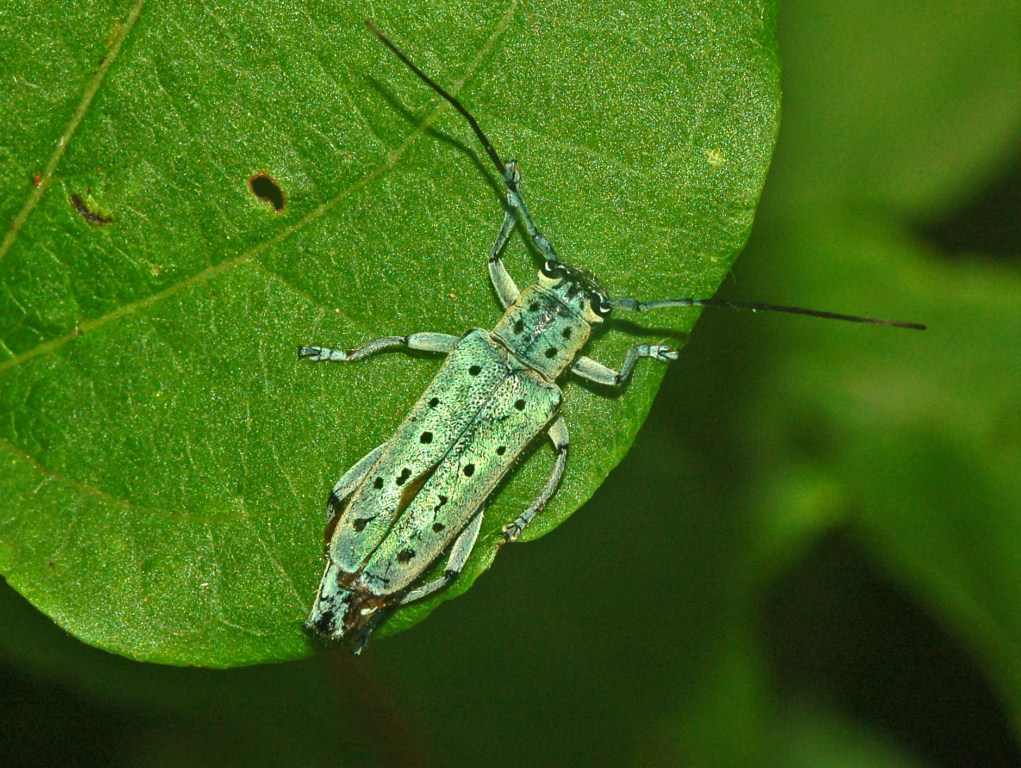
Saperda punctata female

Saperda punctata is a beetle species belonging to the family Cerambycidae, subfamily Lamiinae.

== Distribution ==
This beetle is widespread in most of Europe (Albania, Austria, Bosnia, Bulgaria, Croatia, Czech Republic, France, Germany, Greece, Hungary, Italy, Lithuania, Macedonia, Moldova, Montenegro, Poland, Romania, Russia, Serbia, Slovakia, Slovenia, Spain, Switzerland, Turkey, Ukraine) and in the Near East. In Central Europe it is a protected species, owing to the decrease of old elm trees due to elm disease (Tracheomycosis).

== Description ==
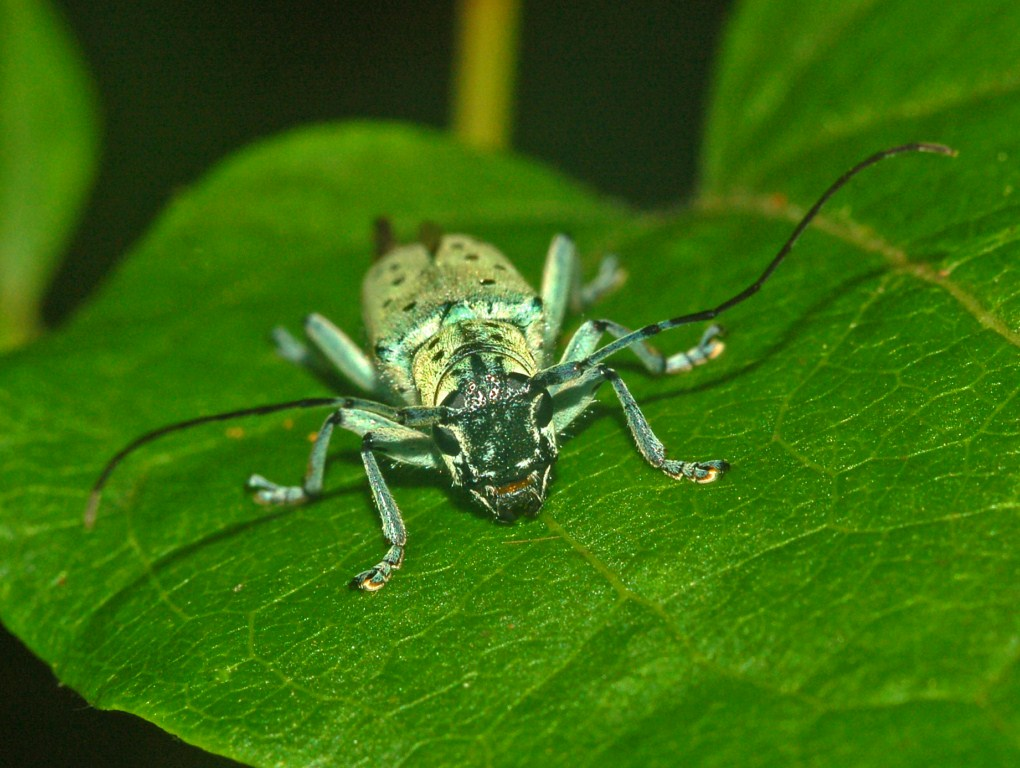
Saperda punctata – frontal view

Saperda punctata can reach a length of 11–18 millimetres (0.43–0.71 in). The head, pronotum and elytra are greenish, with four black spots on pronotum and six black spots on each elytron.

This species is rather similar to Saperda octopunctata.

== Biology ==
It is a nocturnal species. The adults can be encountered from May through August, completing their life cycle in one to two years. Larvae are wintering.

Larvae mainly feed under bark in dead trunks or large branches of elm (Ulmus species), but also of other deciduous trees such as oak and willow (Quercus and Salix species).
