= Saperda subobliterata =

Scientific classification
- Kingdom: Animalia
- Phylum: Arthropoda
- Class: Insecta
- Order: Coleoptera
- Suborder: Polyphaga
- Infraorder: Cucujiformia
- Family: Cerambycidae
- Genus: Saperda
- Species: S. subobliterata

Binomial name
- Saperda subobliterata Pic, 1910

Synonyms
- Saperda harbinensis Chou, Chao & Chiang, 1983; Saperda (Lopezcolonia) subobliterata Pic, 1910; Saperda mandschukuoensis Breuning, 1943

Species of beetle

Saperda subobliterata is a species of beetle in the family Cerambycidae. It was described by Maurice Pic in 1910. It is known from China, Japan and Russia.
