= Saperda viridipennis =

Scientific classification
- Domain: Eukaryota
- Kingdom: Animalia
- Phylum: Arthropoda
- Class: Insecta
- Order: Coleoptera
- Suborder: Polyphaga
- Infraorder: Cucujiformia
- Family: Cerambycidae
- Genus: Saperda
- Species: S. viridipennis

Binomial name
- Saperda viridipennis Gressitt, 1951

Synonyms
- Saperda (Lopezcolonia) viridipennis Gressitt, 1951

Species of beetle

Saperda viridipennis is a species of beetle in the family Cerambycidae. It was described by Gressitt in 1951. It is known from China.
