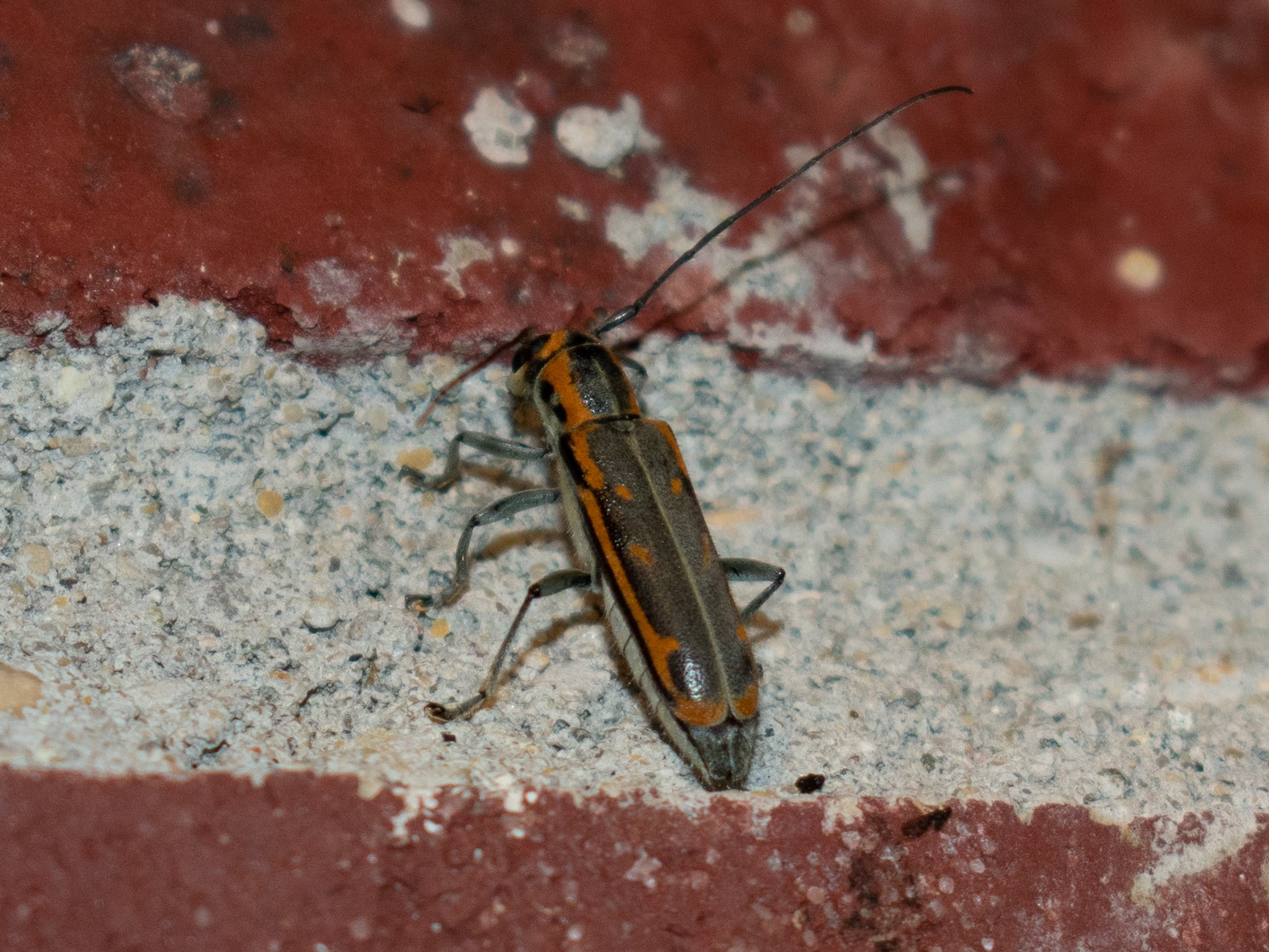

Scientific classification
- Domain: Eukaryota
- Kingdom: Animalia
- Phylum: Arthropoda
- Class: Insecta
- Order: Coleoptera
- Suborder: Polyphaga
- Infraorder: Cucujiformia
- Family: Cerambycidae
- Genus: Saperda
- Species: S. imitans

Binomial name
- Saperda imitans Felt & Joutel, 1904

= Saperda imitans =

Species of beetle

Saperda imitans is a species of beetle in the family Cerambycidae. It was described by Felt and Joutel in 1904. It is known from Canada and the United States.
