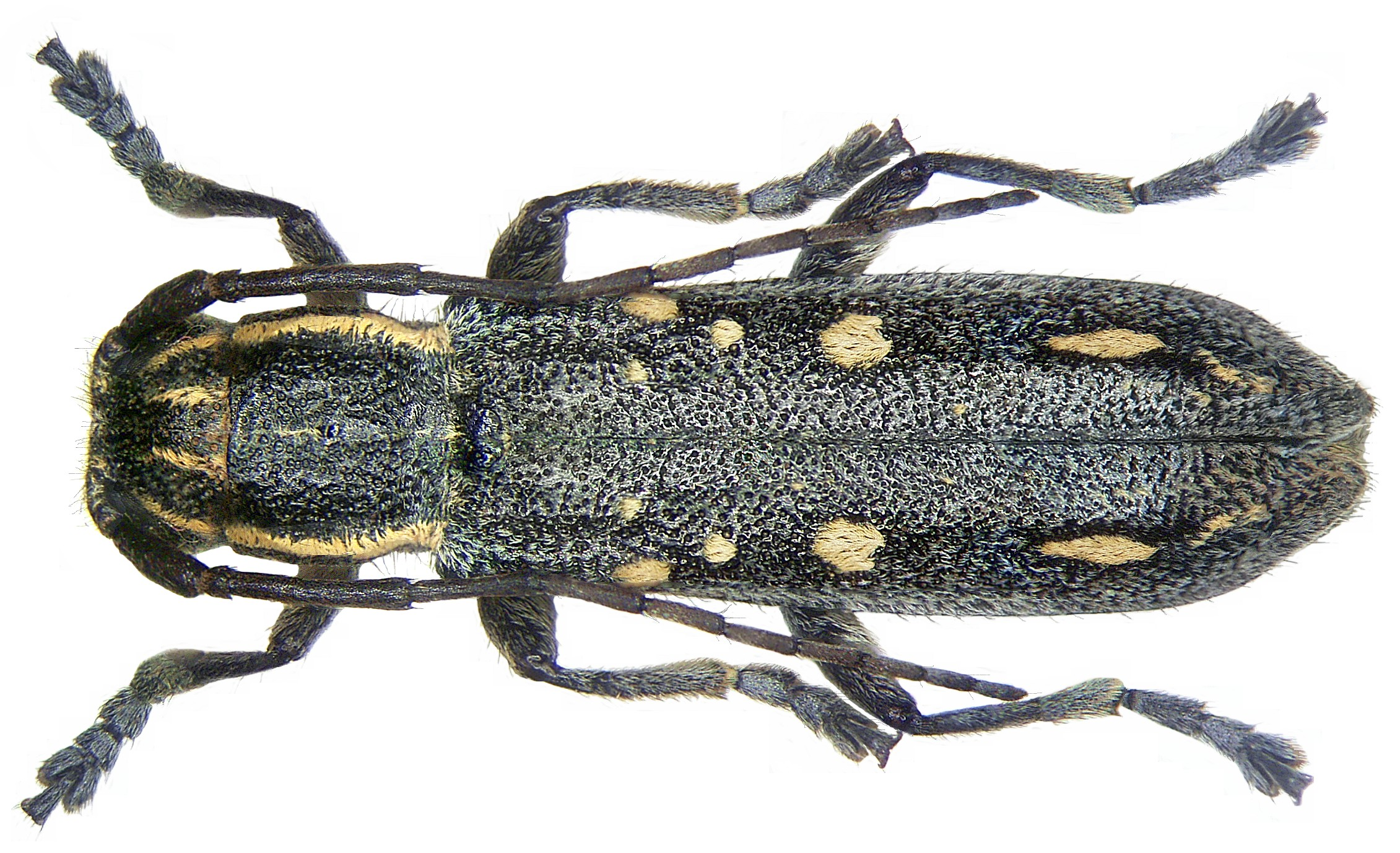
- Cerambycidae size: 13-17 mm

Scientific classification
- Domain: Eukaryota
- Kingdom: Animalia
- Phylum: Arthropoda
- Class: Insecta
- Order: Coleoptera
- Suborder: Polyphaga
- Infraorder: Cucujiformia
- Family: Cerambycidae
- Genus: Saperda
- Species: S. quercus

Binomial name
- Saperda quercus Charpentier, 1825

Synonyms
- Compsidia quercus (Charpentier, 1825)

= Saperda quercus =

Species of beetle

Saperda quercus is a species of beetle in the family Cerambycidae. It was described by Charpentier in 1825. It is known from Turkey, Romania, Bosnia and Herzegovina, Jordan, Serbia, Bulgaria, Greece, Syria, and possibly Hungary. It feeds on Quercus coccifera.

== Subspecies ==
- Saperda quercus quercus Charpentier, 1825
- Saperda quercus ocellata Abeille de Perrin, 1895
