= Saperda facetula =

Scientific classification
- Domain: Eukaryota
- Kingdom: Animalia
- Phylum: Arthropoda
- Class: Insecta
- Order: Coleoptera
- Suborder: Polyphaga
- Infraorder: Cucujiformia
- Family: Cerambycidae
- Genus: Saperda
- Species: S. facetula

Binomial name
- Saperda facetula Holzschuh, 1999

Species of beetle

Saperda facetula is a species of beetle in the family Cerambycidae. It was described by Holzschuh in 1999. It is known from Vietnam.
