= Saperda simulans =

Scientific classification
- Domain: Eukaryota
- Kingdom: Animalia
- Phylum: Arthropoda
- Class: Insecta
- Order: Coleoptera
- Suborder: Polyphaga
- Infraorder: Cucujiformia
- Family: Cerambycidae
- Genus: Saperda
- Species: S. simulans

Binomial name
- Saperda simulans Gahan, 1888

Synonyms
- Saperda (Lopezcolonia) simulans Gahan, 1888

Species of beetle

Saperda simulans is a species of beetle in the family Cerambycidae. It was described by Charles Joseph Gahan in 1888. It is known from China.
