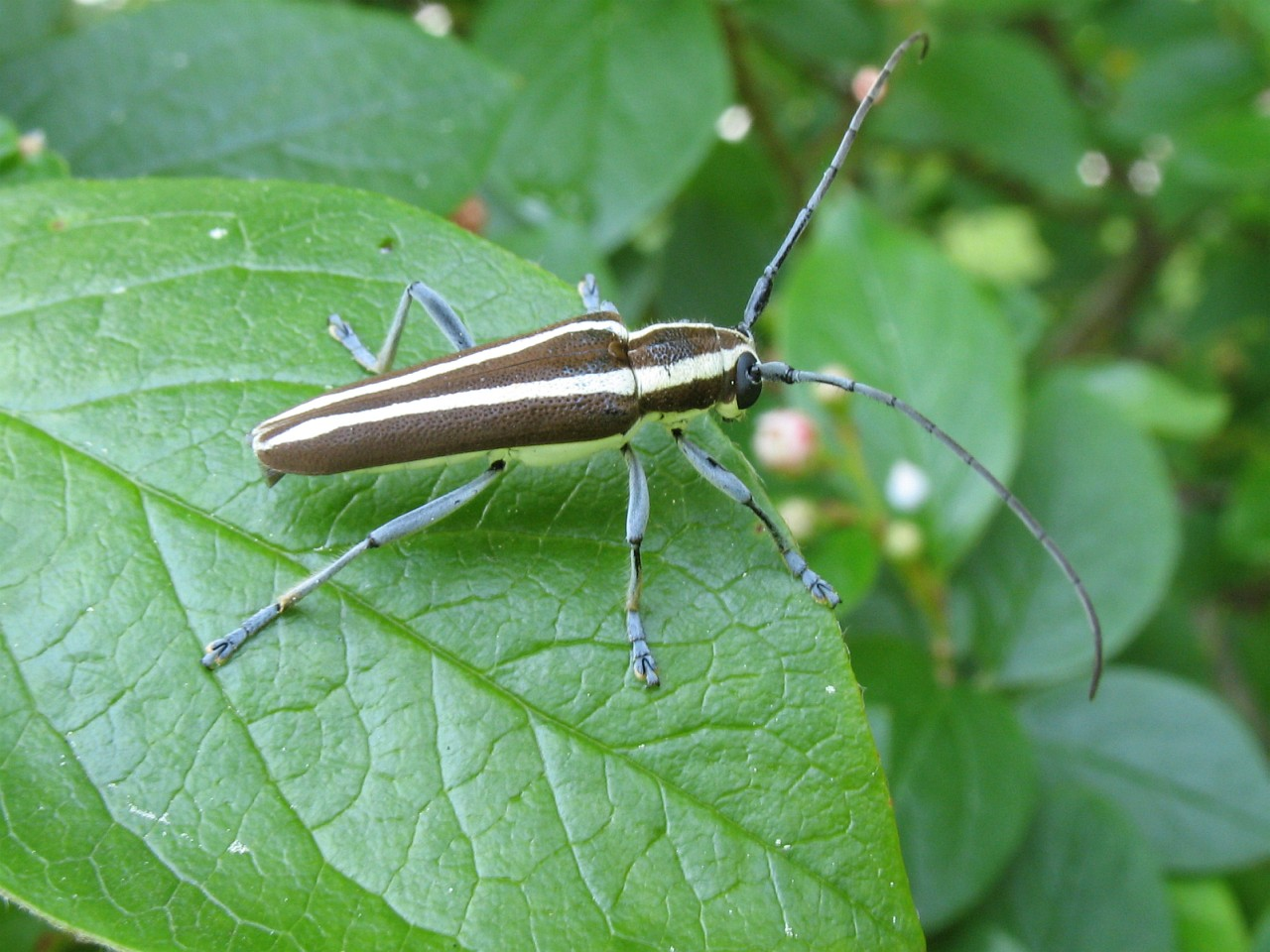

Scientific classification
- Kingdom: Animalia
- Phylum: Arthropoda
- Clade: Pancrustacea
- Class: Insecta
- Order: Coleoptera
- Suborder: Polyphaga
- Infraorder: Cucujiformia
- Family: Cerambycidae
- Genus: Saperda
- Species: S. candida

Binomial name
- Saperda candida Fabricius, 1787

Synonyms
- Saperda bivittata Say, 1824; Cerambyx candidus (Fabricius, 1787)

= Saperda candida =

Species of beetle

Saperda candida, the roundheaded appletree borer, is a species of beetle in the family Cerambycidae. It was described by Johan Christian Fabricius in 1787. It is known from Canada and the United States. It contains the varietas Saperda candida var. bipunctata.

Saperda candida is preyed upon by the parasitoid wasp species Cenocoelius saperdae.
