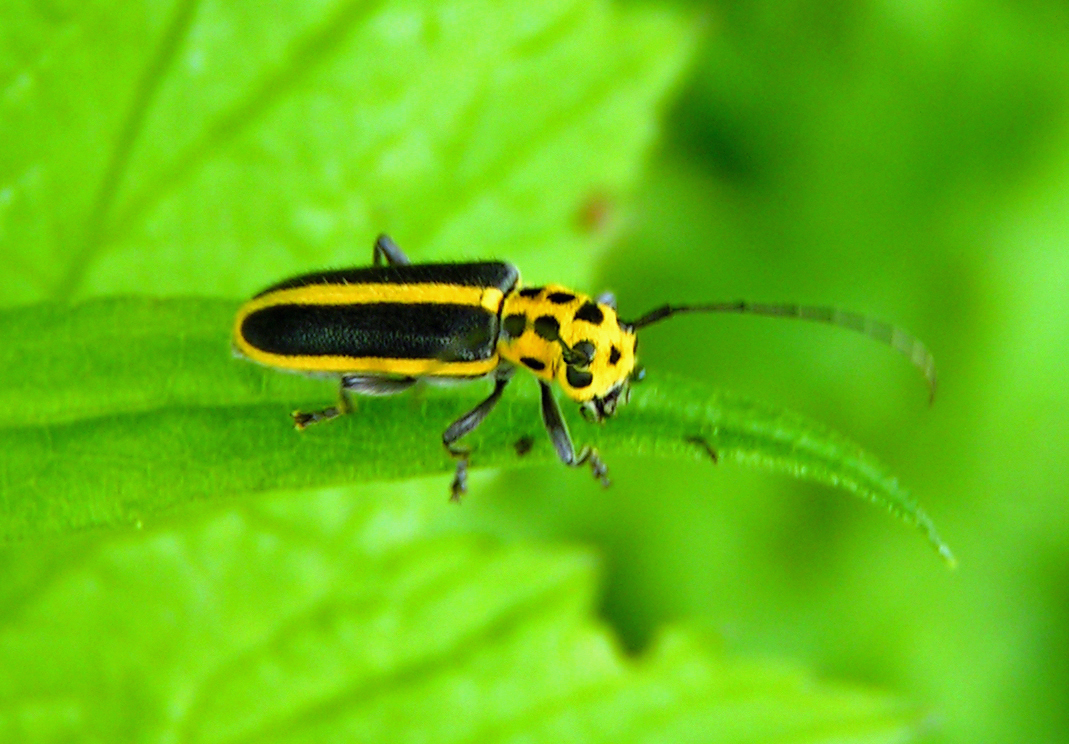

Scientific classification
- Domain: Eukaryota
- Kingdom: Animalia
- Phylum: Arthropoda
- Class: Insecta
- Order: Coleoptera
- Suborder: Polyphaga
- Infraorder: Cucujiformia
- Family: Cerambycidae
- Genus: Saperda
- Species: S. puncticollis

Binomial name
- Saperda puncticollis Say, 1824

Synonyms
- Saperda trigeminata Randall, 1838

= Saperda puncticollis =

Species of beetle

Saperda puncticollis is a species of beetle in the family Cerambycidae. It was described by Thomas Say in 1824. It has been found in Canada and the United States.
