= Saperda cretata =

Scientific classification
- Kingdom: Animalia
- Phylum: Arthropoda
- Clade: Pancrustacea
- Class: Insecta
- Order: Coleoptera
- Suborder: Polyphaga
- Infraorder: Cucujiformia
- Family: Cerambycidae
- Genus: Saperda
- Species: S. cretata

Binomial name
- Saperda cretata Newman, 1838

Species of beetle

Saperda cretata is a species of beetle in the family Cerambycidae. It was described by Newman in 1838. It is known from Canada and the United States. One common name for this beetle is spotted apple tree borer. It is a common prey item for woodpeckers.
