= Saperda robusta =

Scientific classification
- Domain: Eukaryota
- Kingdom: Animalia
- Phylum: Arthropoda
- Class: Insecta
- Order: Coleoptera
- Suborder: Polyphaga
- Infraorder: Cucujiformia
- Family: Cerambycidae
- Genus: Saperda
- Species: S. robusta

Binomial name
- Saperda robusta (Schmidt, 1967)

Synonyms
- Saperdopsis robusta Schmidt, 1967

Species of beetle

Saperda robusta is an extinct species of beetle in the family Cerambycidae, that existed in what is now Germany during the Upper Pliocene. It was described by Schmidt in 1967.
