= Saperda bilineatocollis =

Scientific classification
- Kingdom: Animalia
- Phylum: Arthropoda
- Class: Insecta
- Order: Coleoptera
- Suborder: Polyphaga
- Infraorder: Cucujiformia
- Family: Cerambycidae
- Genus: Saperda
- Species: S. bilineatocollis

Binomial name
- Saperda bilineatocollis Pic, 1924

Synonyms
- Saperda (Compsidia) bilineatocollis Pic, 1924

Species of beetle

Saperda bilineatocollis is a species of beetle in the family Cerambycidae. It was described by Maurice Pic in 1924. It is known from Russia and China.
