= Saperda interrupta =

Scientific classification
- Domain: Eukaryota
- Kingdom: Animalia
- Phylum: Arthropoda
- Class: Insecta
- Order: Coleoptera
- Suborder: Polyphaga
- Infraorder: Cucujiformia
- Family: Cerambycidae
- Genus: Saperda
- Species: S. interrupta

Binomial name
- Saperda interrupta Gebler, 1825

Synonyms
- Saperda (Lopezcolonia) interrupta Gebler, 1825

Species of beetle

Saperda interrupta is a species of beetle in the family Cerambycidae. It was described by Gebler in 1825. It is known from China, Russia, Siberia, Korea and Japan. It is associated with coniferous plantations, and infests species of fir, pine, spruce and other conifers.

== Varietas ==
- Saperda interrupta var. laterimaculata Motschoulsky, 1860
- Saperda interrupta var. biexcisa Plavilstshikov, 1931
- Saperda interrupta var. victori Plavilstshikov, 1931
- Saperda interrupta var. tranversefasciata Plavilstshikov, 1931
- Saperda interrupta var. subcandida Plavilstshikov, 1931
