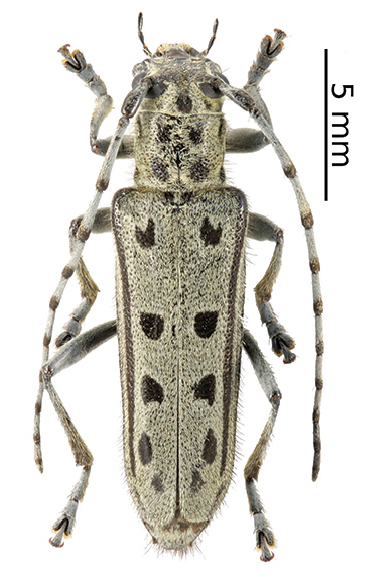
- Saperda alberti (female)

Scientific classification
- Domain: Eukaryota
- Kingdom: Animalia
- Phylum: Arthropoda
- Class: Insecta
- Order: Coleoptera
- Suborder: Polyphaga
- Infraorder: Cucujiformia
- Family: Cerambycidae
- Genus: Saperda
- Species: S. alberti

Binomial name
- Saperda alberti Plavilstshikov, 1916

Synonyms
- Saperda decempunctata Gebler, 1830

= Saperda alberti =

Species of beetle

Saperda alberti is a species of beetle in the family Cerambycidae. It was described by Nikolay Nikolaevich Plavilstshchikov in 1916. It is known from Japan, North Korea, China, Mongolia, and Russia.
