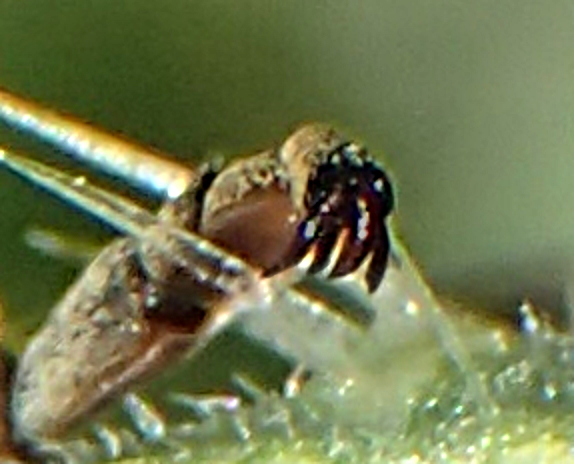

Scientific classification
- Domain: Eukaryota
- Kingdom: Animalia
- Phylum: Arthropoda
- Class: Insecta
- Order: Coleoptera
- Suborder: Polyphaga
- Infraorder: Cucujiformia
- Family: Cerambycidae
- Tribe: Saperdini
- Genus: Oxylia

= Oxylia =

Genus of beetles

Oxylia is a genus of longhorn beetles of the subfamily Lamiinae, containing the following species:

- Oxylia argentata (Ménetriés, 1832)
- Oxylia duponcheli (Brullé, 1833)
