= Saperda octomaculata =

Scientific classification
- Domain: Eukaryota
- Kingdom: Animalia
- Phylum: Arthropoda
- Class: Insecta
- Order: Coleoptera
- Suborder: Polyphaga
- Infraorder: Cucujiformia
- Family: Cerambycidae
- Genus: Saperda
- Species: S. octomaculata

Binomial name
- Saperda octomaculata Blessig, 1873

Species of beetle

Saperda octomaculata is a species of beetle in the family Cerambycidae. It was described by Blessig in 1873. It is known from China, Russia, Japan and Mongolia.
