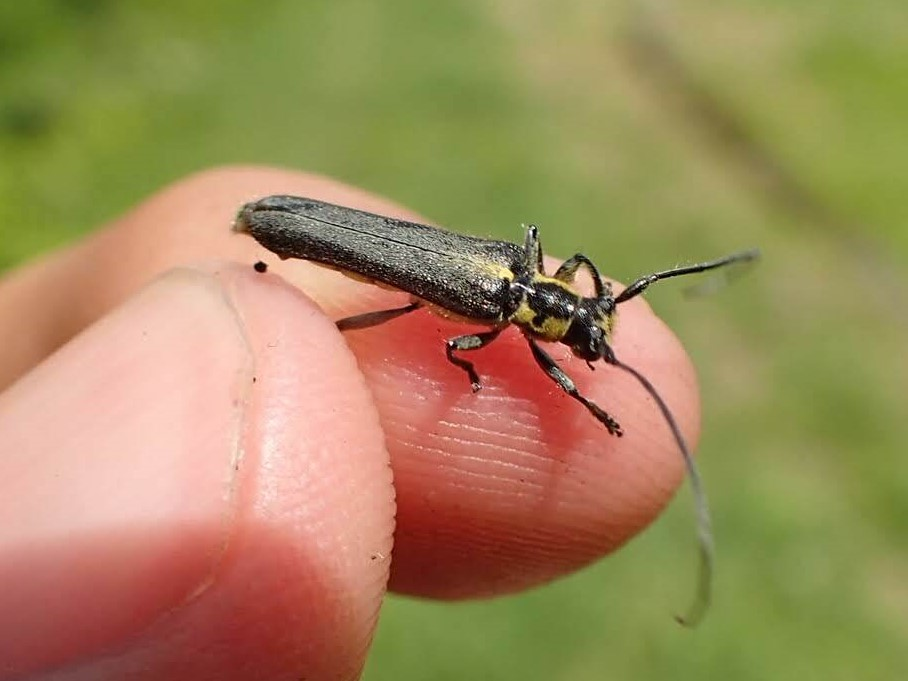

Scientific classification
- Domain: Eukaryota
- Kingdom: Animalia
- Phylum: Arthropoda
- Class: Insecta
- Order: Coleoptera
- Suborder: Polyphaga
- Infraorder: Cucujiformia
- Family: Cerambycidae
- Genus: Saperda
- Species: S. ohbayashii

Binomial name
- Saperda ohbayashii Podany, 1963

Synonyms
- Saperda breuningi Ohbayashi, 1957; Saperda (Lopezcolonia) ohbayashii Podaný, 1963

= Saperda ohbayashii =

Species of beetle

Saperda ohbayashii is a species of beetle in the family Cerambycidae. It was described by Podany in 1963. It is known from Japan.
