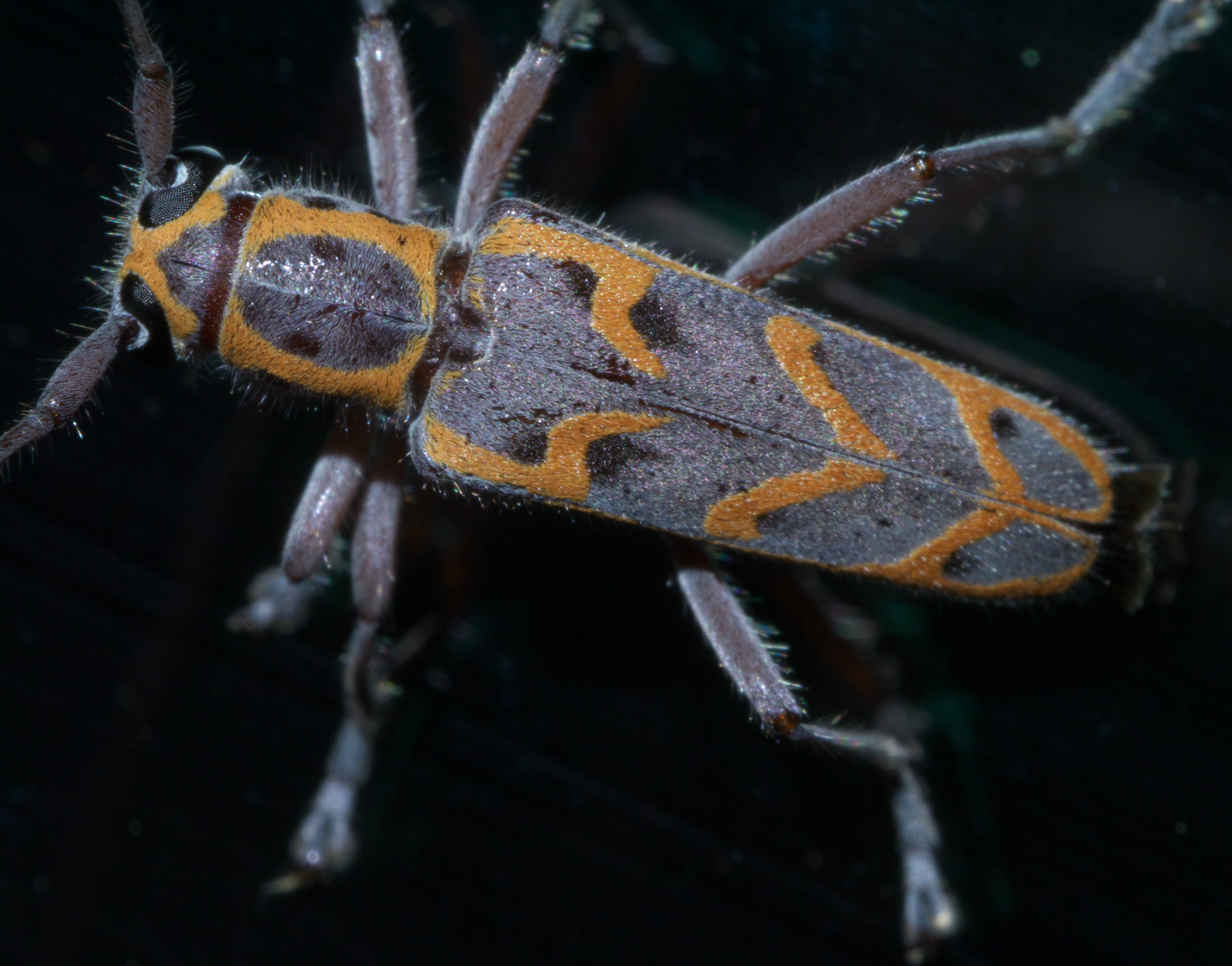

Scientific classification
- Kingdom: Animalia
- Phylum: Arthropoda
- Clade: Pancrustacea
- Class: Insecta
- Order: Coleoptera
- Suborder: Polyphaga
- Infraorder: Cucujiformia
- Family: Cerambycidae
- Genus: Saperda
- Species: S. tridentata

Binomial name
- Saperda tridentata Olivier, 1795

Synonyms
- Eutetrapha tridentata (Olivier, 1795); Compsidea tridentata (Olivier, 1795); Saperda tridentata var. dubiosa Haldeman, 1847; Saperda dubiosa Haldeman, 1847; Saperda tridentata var. rubronotata Fitch, 1858; Saperda tridentata var. intermedia Fitch, 1858; Saperda tridentata var. trifasciata Casey, 1913

= Saperda tridentata =

Species of beetle

The elm borer (Saperda tridentata) is a species of beetle in the family Cerambycidae. It was described by Guillaume-Antoine Olivier in 1795. It is known from Canada and the United States. It feeds on Ulmus rubra and Ulmus americana. It acts as a vector for the fungus Ophiostoma ulmi, and as a host for the parasitoid wasp Cenocoelius saperdae.
