= Saperda obliqua =

Scientific classification
- Domain: Eukaryota
- Kingdom: Animalia
- Phylum: Arthropoda
- Class: Insecta
- Order: Coleoptera
- Suborder: Polyphaga
- Infraorder: Cucujiformia
- Family: Cerambycidae
- Genus: Saperda
- Species: S. obliqua

Binomial name
- Saperda obliqua Say, 1826

Synonyms
- Anaerea obliqua (Say) Haldeman, 1847

Species of beetle

Saperda obliqua is a species of beetle in the family Cerambycidae. It was described by Thomas Say in 1826. It is known from Canada and the United States.
