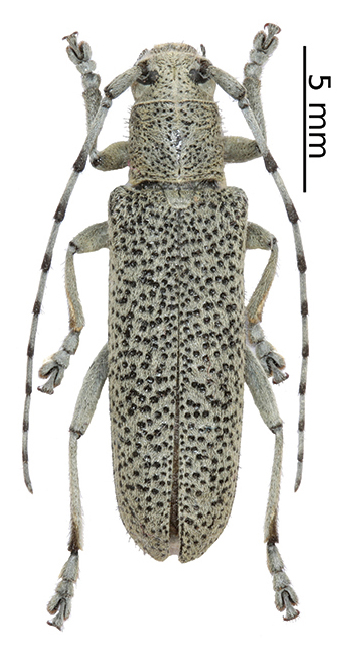
- Female

Scientific classification
- Kingdom: Animalia
- Phylum: Arthropoda
- Clade: Pancrustacea
- Class: Insecta
- Order: Coleoptera
- Suborder: Polyphaga
- Infraorder: Cucujiformia
- Family: Cerambycidae
- Genus: Saperda
- Species: S. similis

Binomial name
- Saperda similis Laicharting, 1784

Synonyms
- Saperda phoca Fröhlich, 1793; Amilia phoca (Fröhlich, 1793); Anaerea similis (Laicharting) Villiers, 1978

= Saperda similis =

Species of beetle

Saperda similis is a species of beetle in the family Cerambycidae. It was described by Laicharting in 1784. It has a wide distribution in Europe. It feeds on Salix caprea. It contains the varietas Saperda similis var. albopubescens.

S. similis measures between 15 and 22 mm (0.59 and 0.87 in).
