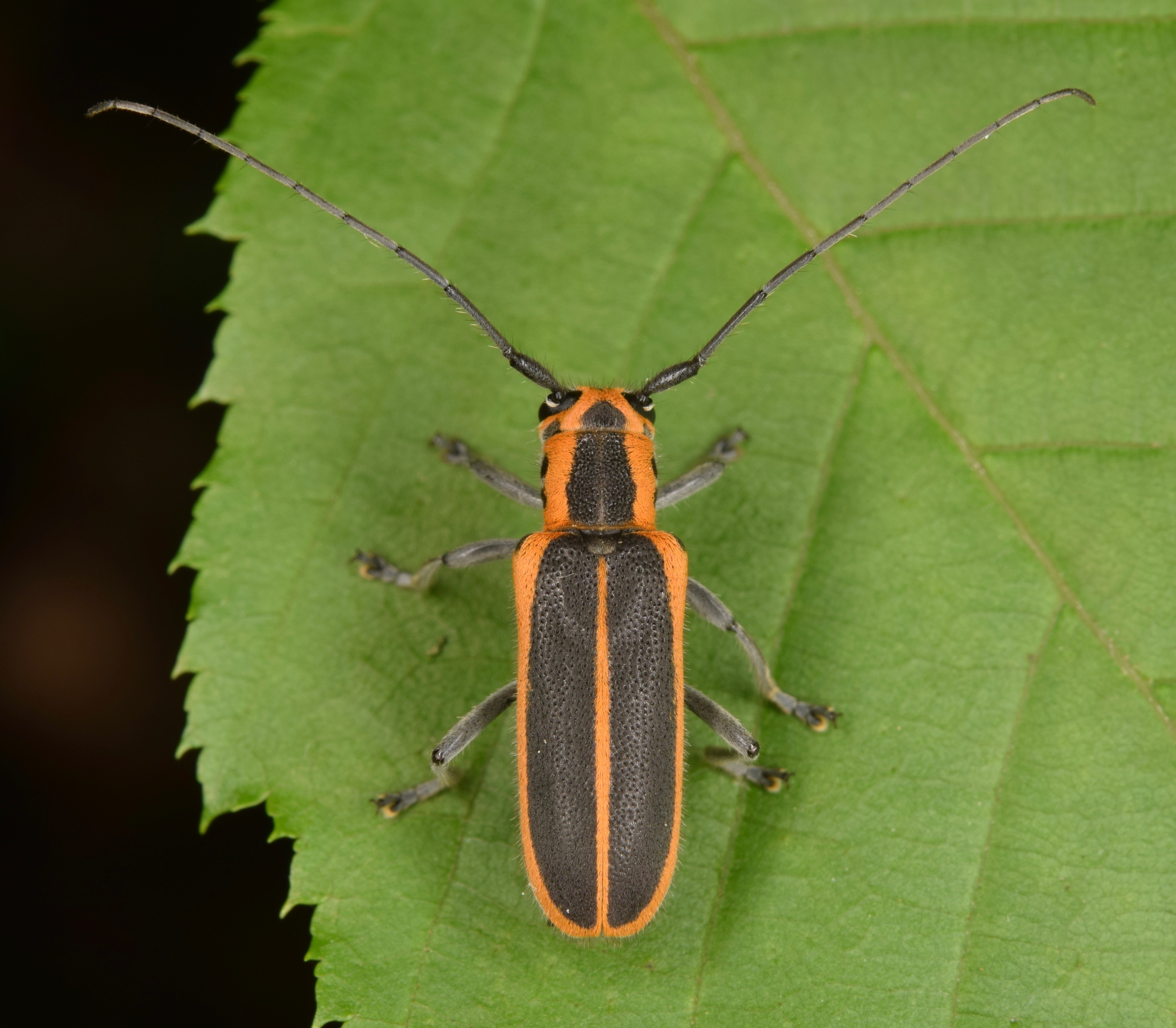

Scientific classification
- Kingdom: Animalia
- Phylum: Arthropoda
- Class: Insecta
- Order: Coleoptera
- Suborder: Polyphaga
- Infraorder: Cucujiformia
- Family: Cerambycidae
- Genus: Saperda
- Species: S. lateralis

Binomial name
- Saperda lateralis Fabricius, 1775

Synonyms
- Compsidea lateralis Haldeman, 1847; Cerambyx lateralis Gmelin, 1790; Saperda imitans var. connecta Mutchler & Weiss, 1923

= Saperda lateralis =

Species of beetle

Saperda lateralis is a species of beetle in the family Cerambycidae. It was described by Johan Christian Fabricius in 1775. It is known from Canada and the United States.

== Varietas ==
- Saperda lateralis var. connecta Felt & Joutel, 1904
- Saperda lateralis var. abbreviata Fitch, 1858
- Saperda lateralis var. transeuns Breuning, 1952
- Saperda lateralis var. suturalis Fitch, 1858
