= Saperda kojimai =

Scientific classification
- Domain: Eukaryota
- Kingdom: Animalia
- Phylum: Arthropoda
- Class: Insecta
- Order: Coleoptera
- Suborder: Polyphaga
- Infraorder: Cucujiformia
- Family: Cerambycidae
- Genus: Saperda
- Species: S. kojimai

Binomial name
- Saperda kojimai Makihara & Nakamura, 1985

Synonyms
- Saperda (Lopezcolonia) kojimai Makihara & Nakamura, 1985

Species of beetle

Saperda kojimai is a species of beetle in the family Cerambycidae. It was described by Hiroshi Makihara and Nakamura in 1985. It is known from Taiwan.
