= Saperda bacillicornis =

Scientific classification
- Domain: Eukaryota
- Kingdom: Animalia
- Phylum: Arthropoda
- Class: Insecta
- Order: Coleoptera
- Suborder: Polyphaga
- Infraorder: Cucujiformia
- Family: Cerambycidae
- Genus: Saperda
- Species: S. bacillicornis

Binomial name
- Saperda bacillicornis Pesarini & Sabbadini, 1997

Synonyms
- Saperda (Compsidia) bacillicornis Pesarini & Sabbadini, 1997

Species of beetle

Saperda bacillicornis is a species of beetle in the family Cerambycidae. It was described by Pesarini and Sabbadini in 1997. It is known from China.
