= Saperda horni =

Scientific classification
- Domain: Eukaryota
- Kingdom: Animalia
- Phylum: Arthropoda
- Class: Insecta
- Order: Coleoptera
- Suborder: Polyphaga
- Infraorder: Cucujiformia
- Family: Cerambycidae
- Genus: Saperda
- Species: S. horni

Binomial name
- Saperda horni Joutel, 1902

Synonyms
- Saperda uteana Casey, 1924; Saperda hornii Joutel, 1902 (Missp.; ICZN Article 33.3.1)

Species of beetle

Saperda horni is a species of beetle in the family Cerambycidae. It was described by Joutel in 1902. It is known from Canada and the United States. The species name is often misspelled as hornii.
