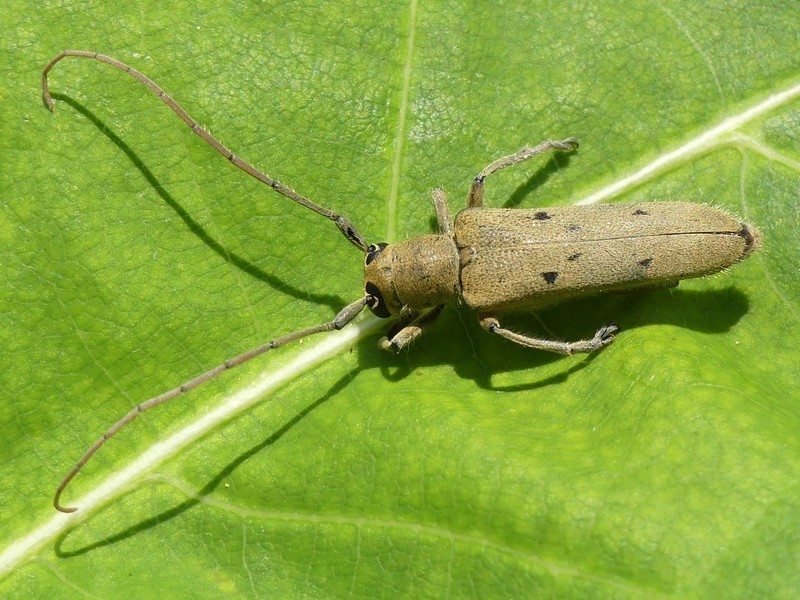

Scientific classification
- Domain: Eukaryota
- Kingdom: Animalia
- Phylum: Arthropoda
- Class: Insecta
- Order: Coleoptera
- Suborder: Polyphaga
- Infraorder: Cucujiformia
- Family: Cerambycidae
- Genus: Saperda
- Species: S. vestita

Binomial name
- Saperda vestita Say, 1824

Synonyms
- Saperda atkinsoni Curtis, 1829

= Saperda vestita =

Species of beetle

The Linden borer (Saperda vestita) is a species of beetle in the family Cerambycidae. It was described by Thomas Say in 1824. It is known from Canada and the United States. It feeds on Tilia americana.
