= Saperda florissantensis =

Scientific classification
- Domain: Eukaryota
- Kingdom: Animalia
- Phylum: Arthropoda
- Class: Insecta
- Order: Coleoptera
- Suborder: Polyphaga
- Infraorder: Cucujiformia
- Family: Cerambycidae
- Genus: Saperda
- Species: S. florissantensis

Binomial name
- Saperda florissantensis Wickham, 1916

Species of beetle

Saperda florissantensis is an extinct species of beetle in the family Cerambycidae, that existed in what is now the United States during the Miocene. It was described by Wickham in 1916.
