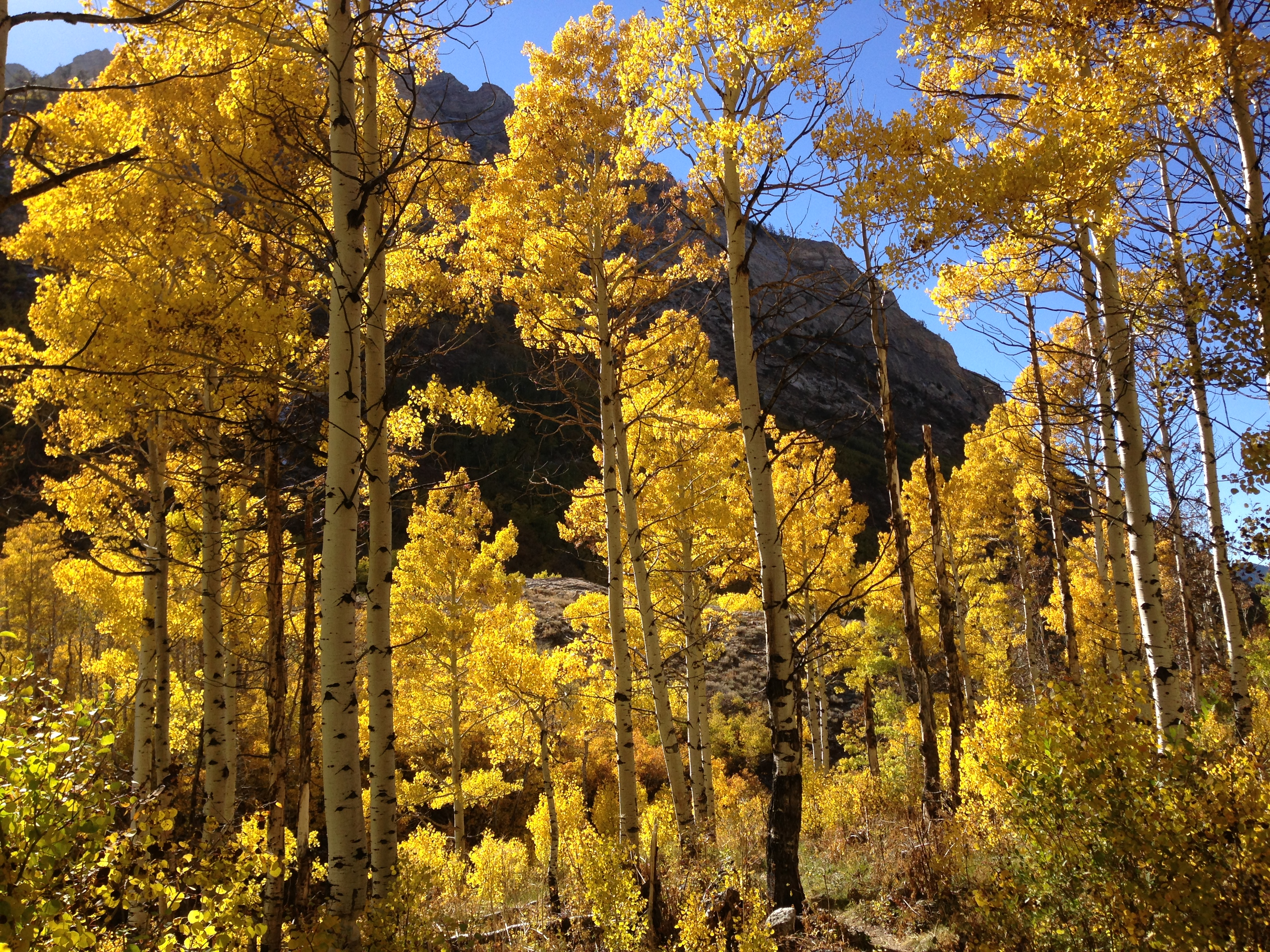
- Quaking aspen grove in Lamoille Canyon, Nevada, U.S.

Conservation status
- Least Concern (IUCN 3.1)

Scientific classification
- Kingdom: Plantae
- Clade: Embryophytes
- Clade: Tracheophytes
- Clade: Angiosperms
- Clade: Eudicots
- Clade: Rosids
- Order: Malpighiales
- Family: Salicaceae
- Genus: Populus
- Section: Populus sect. Populus
- Species: P. tremuloides

Binomial name
- Populus tremuloides Michx.
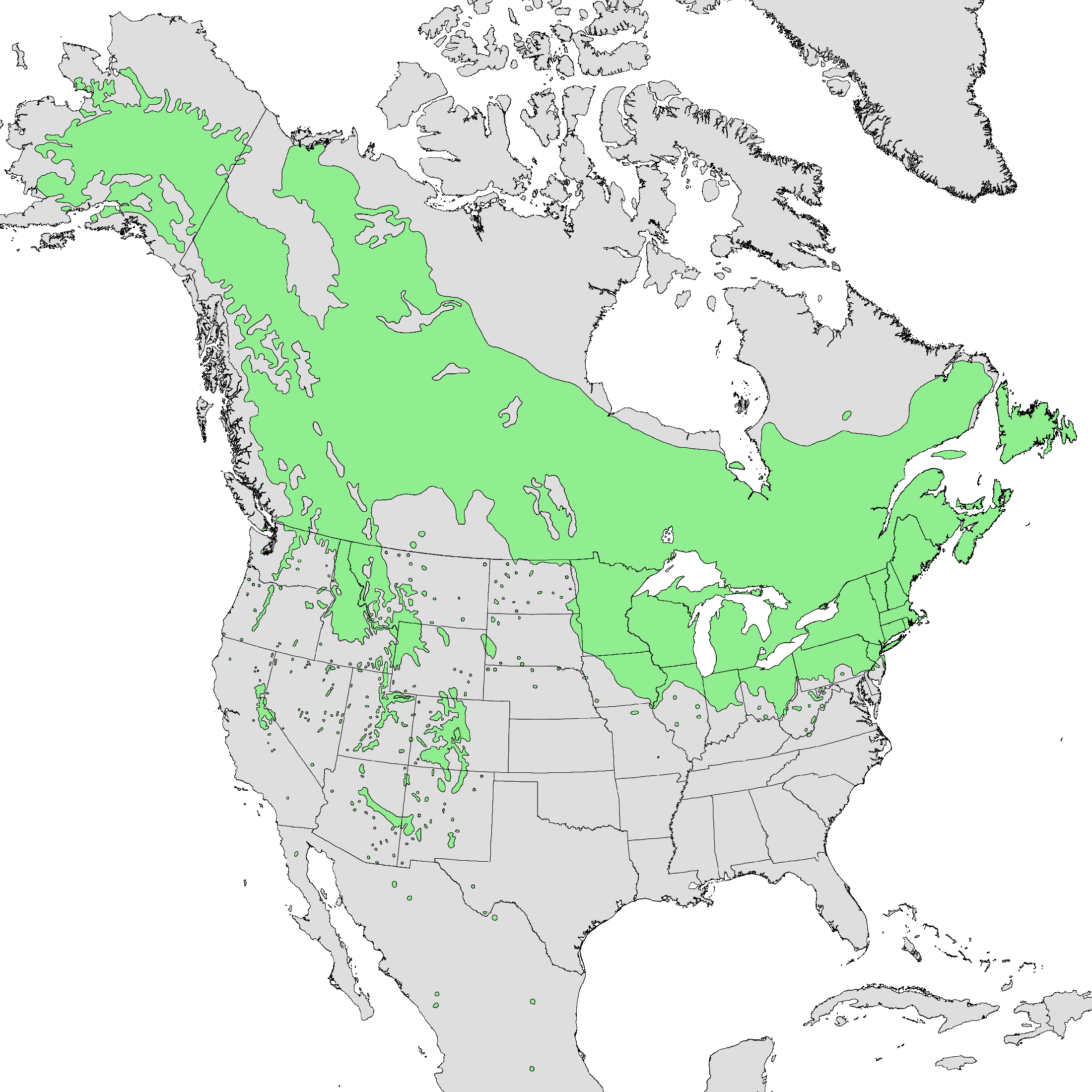

= Populus tremuloides =

Quaking aspen

Species of tree native North America

Populus tremuloides is a deciduous tree native to cooler areas of North America, one of several species referred to by the common name aspen. It is commonly called quaking aspen, trembling aspen, American aspen, mountain or golden aspen, trembling poplar, white poplar, and popple, as well as others. The trees have tall trunks, up to 25 metres (82 feet) tall, with smooth pale bark, scarred with black. The glossy green leaves, dull beneath, become golden to yellow, rarely red, in autumn. The species often propagates through its roots to form large clonal groves originating from a shared root system. These roots are not rhizomes, as new growth develops from adventitious buds on the parent root system (the ortet).

Populus tremuloides is the most widely distributed tree in North America, being found from Canada to central Mexico. It is the defining species of the aspen parkland biome in the Prairie Provinces of Canada and extreme northwest Minnesota.

== Description ==
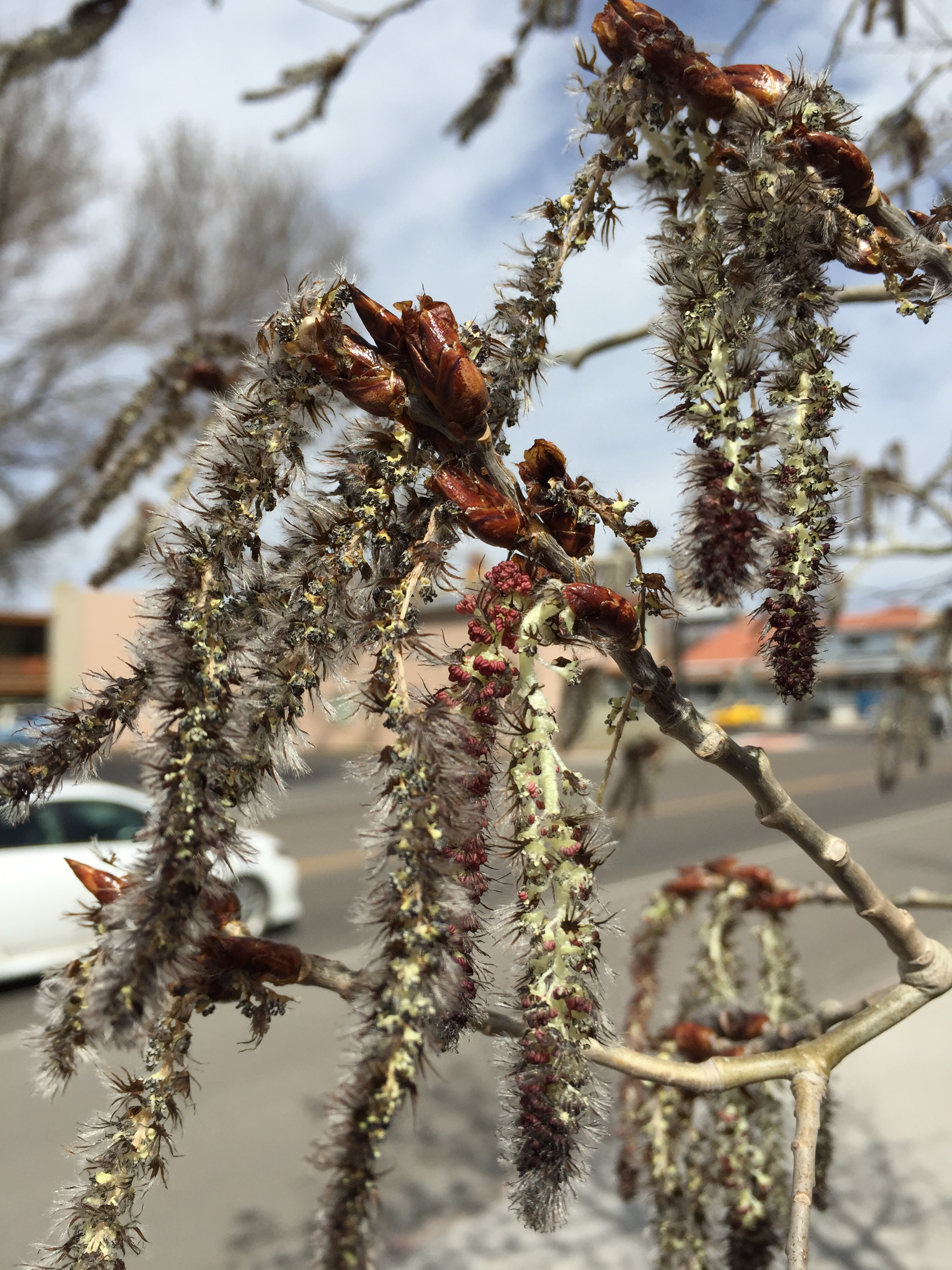
Aspen catkins in spring

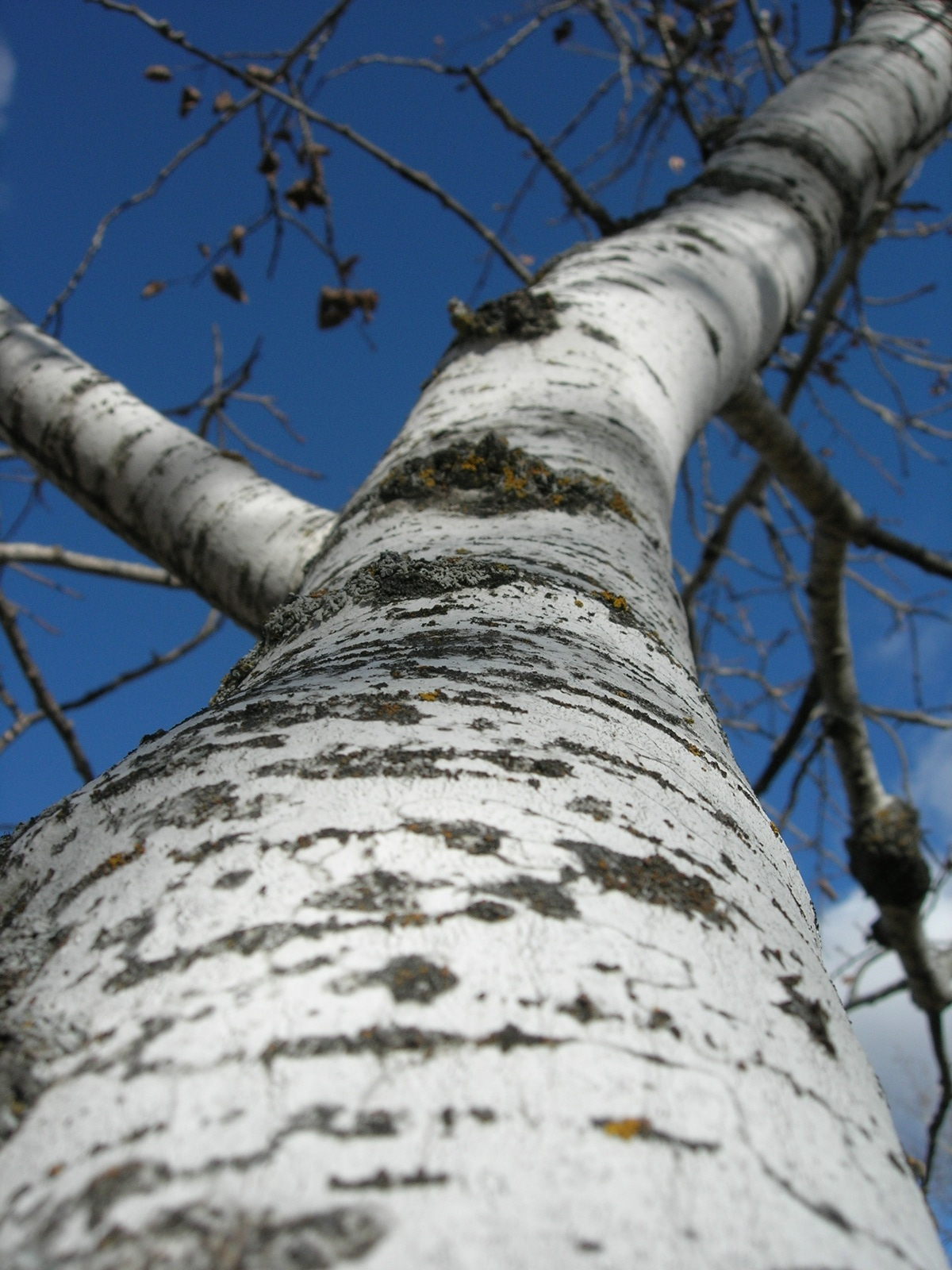
Trembling aspen bark

The quaking aspen is a tall, fast-growing tree, usually 15–18 meters (50–60 ft) at maturity, with a trunk 25 centimeters (10 in) in diameter; records are 36.5 m (119 ft 9 in) in height and 1.37 m (4 ft 6 in) in diameter. The bark is relatively smooth, whitish (light green when young), and is marked by thick black horizontal scars and prominent black knots. Parallel vertical scars are tell-tale signs of elk, which strip off aspen bark with their front teeth.

The leaves on mature trees are nearly round, 4–6 cm (1 1/2–2 1/4 in) in diameter with small rounded teeth, and a 3–7 cm (1 1/4–2 3/4 in) long flattened petiole. The leaves are green above and gray below. Young trees and root sprouts have much larger (10–20 cm, 4–8 in long), nearly triangular leaves. (Some species of Populus have petioles flattened partially along their length, while the aspens and some other poplars have them flattened from side to side along the entire length of the petiole.)

Aspens are dioecious, with separate male and female clones. The flowers are catkins 4–6 cm (1 1/2–2 1/4 in) long, produced in early spring before the leaves. The fruit is a 10 cm-long (4 in) pendulous string of 6-millimeter (1/4 in) capsules, each capsule containing about ten minute seeds embedded in cottony fluff, which aids wind dispersal of the seeds when they are mature in early summer. Trees as young as 2–3 years old may begin seed production, but significant output starts at 10 years of age. Best seed production is obtained between the ages of 50 and 70 years.

Quaking aspen grows more slowly in the dry conditions of western North America than it does in the more humid east and also lives longer—ages of 80–100 years are typical, with some individuals living 200 years; the root system can live much longer. In the east, stands decay faster, sometimes in 60 years or less depending on the region.

== Name ==
The quaking or trembling of the leaves that is referred to in the common names is due to the flexible flattened petioles. The flattened petioles cause the leaves to twist in the wind. The specific epithet, tremuloides, evokes this trembling behavior and can be literally translated as "like (Populus) tremula", the Eurasian trembling aspen.

== Distribution ==
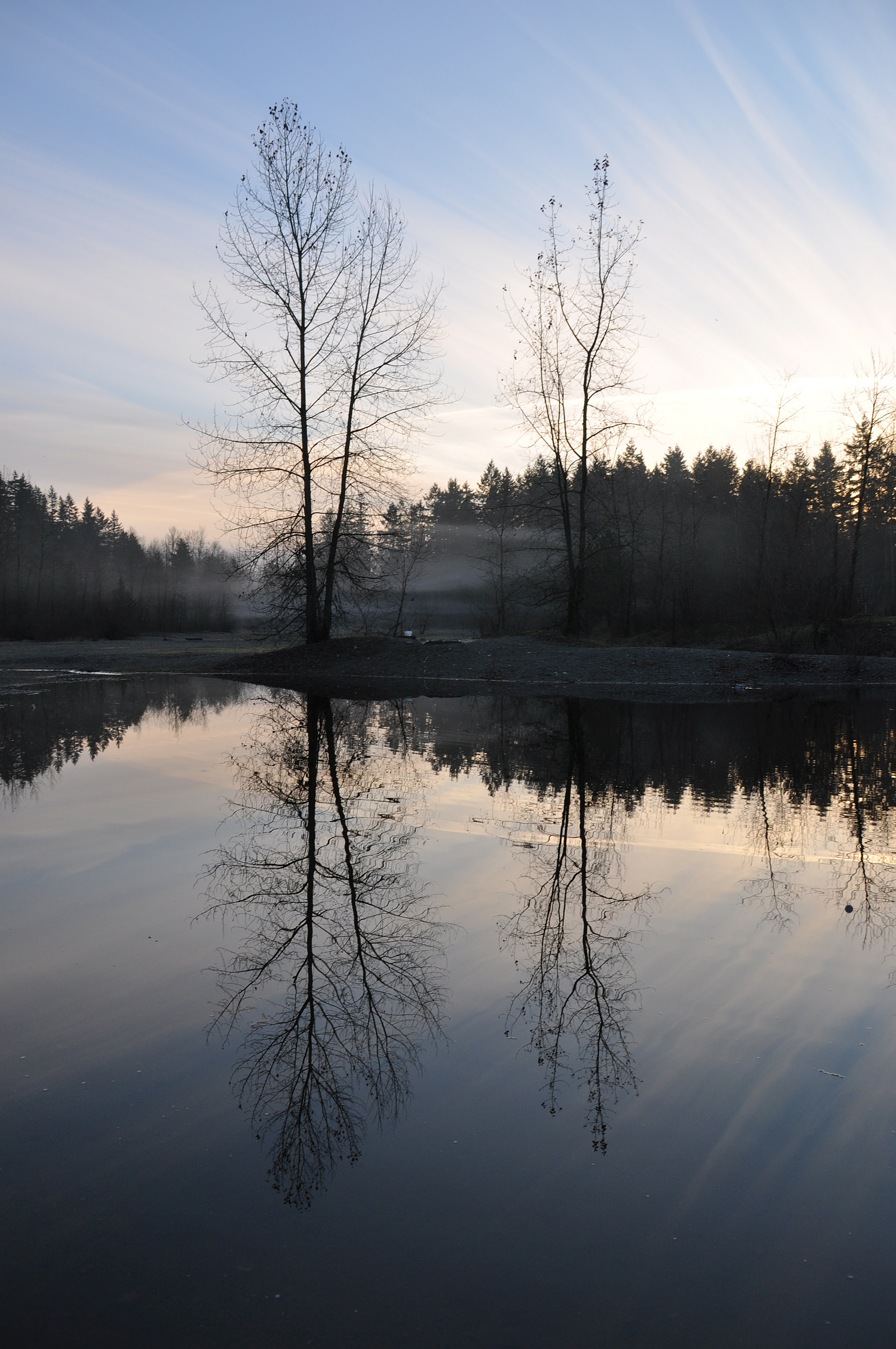
Trembling aspen at sunset in Langley, British Columbia, December 2010

Quaking aspen occurs across Canada in all provinces and territories, with the possible exception of regions of Nunavut north of the James Bay islands. In the United States, it can be found as far north as the northern foothills of the Brooks Range in Alaska, where road margins and gravel pads provide islands of well-drained habitat in a region where soils are often waterlogged due to underlying permafrost. It occurs at low elevations as far south as northern Nebraska and central Indiana. In the Western United States, this tree rarely survives at elevations lower than 1,500 feet (460 m) due to hot summers experienced below that elevation, and is generally found at 5,000–12,000 feet (1,500–3,700 m).

It grows at high elevations as far south as Guanajuato, Mexico. It grows in isolated areas in northeastern Mexico as well as Baja California, Jalisco, the State of Mexico, Michoacán, Sinaloa, Sonora, and Veracruz.

Quaking aspen grows in a wide variety of climatic conditions. January and July average temperatures range from −30 °C (−22 °F) and 16 °C (61 °F) in the Alaska Interior to −3 °C (27 °F) and 23 °C (73 °F) in Fort Wayne, Indiana. Average annual precipitation ranges from 1,020 mm (40 inches) in Gander, Newfoundland and Labrador to as little as 180 mm (7 inches) in the Alaska Interior. The southern limit of the species' range roughly follows the 24 °C (75 °F) mean July isotherm.

In the sagebrush steppe, aspens occur with chokecherry, serviceberry, and hawthorn, forming a habitable haven for animal life. Shrub-like dwarf clones exist in marginal environments too cold and dry to be hospitable to full-size trees, for example at the species' upper elevation limits in the White Mountains.

== Ecology ==
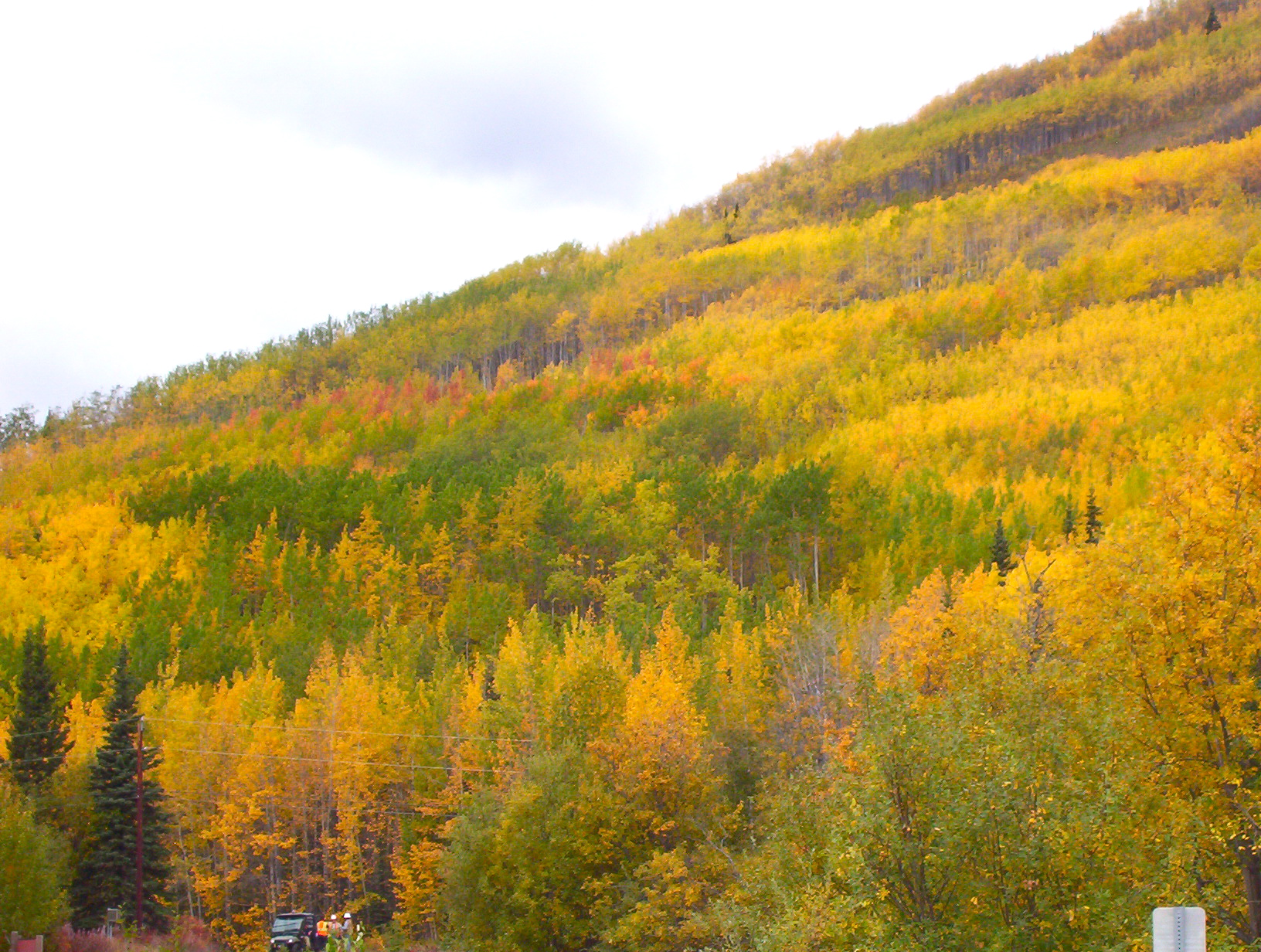
Clonal colonies of different autumnal colors on a mountainside in the Matanuska Valley in Alaska

Quaking aspen propagates itself primarily through root sprouts, and extensive clonal colonies are common. Each colony is its own clone, and all trees in the clone have identical characteristics and share a single root structure. A clone may turn color earlier or later in the fall than its neighboring aspen clones. Fall colors are usually bright tones of yellow; in some areas, red blushes may be occasionally seen. As all trees in a given clonal colony are considered part of the same organism, one clonal colony, named Pando, is considered the heaviest and oldest living organism on the planet. Pando spans across 43 hectares and weighs six million kilograms. Most scientists agree that the Pando seed set down sometime between 8,000 and 12,000 years ago when climate currents in the region shifted at the end of the last ice age. Aspens do produce seeds, but seldom grow from them. Pollination is inhibited by the fact that aspens are either male or female, and large stands are usually all clones of the same sex. Even if pollinated, the small seeds (three million per pound) are only viable a short time as they lack a stored food source or a protective coating.

The buds and bark supply food for snowshoe hares, moose, black bears, cottontail rabbits, porcupines, deer, grouse, and mountain beavers. The shoots are eaten by sheep, goats, and cattle. Sheep and goats also browse the foliage, as do game animals including elk. Grouse and quail especially eat the buds in winter. Mammals such as beavers and rabbits eat the bark, foliage, and buds. Beavers also store aspen logs for winter food. Other animals nest in aspen groves. The leaves of the quaking aspen and other species in the genus Populus serve as food for caterpillars of various moths and butterflies. Quaking aspen trees also serve as hosts to certain damaging insects such as the large aspen tortrix.

=== Dieback ===
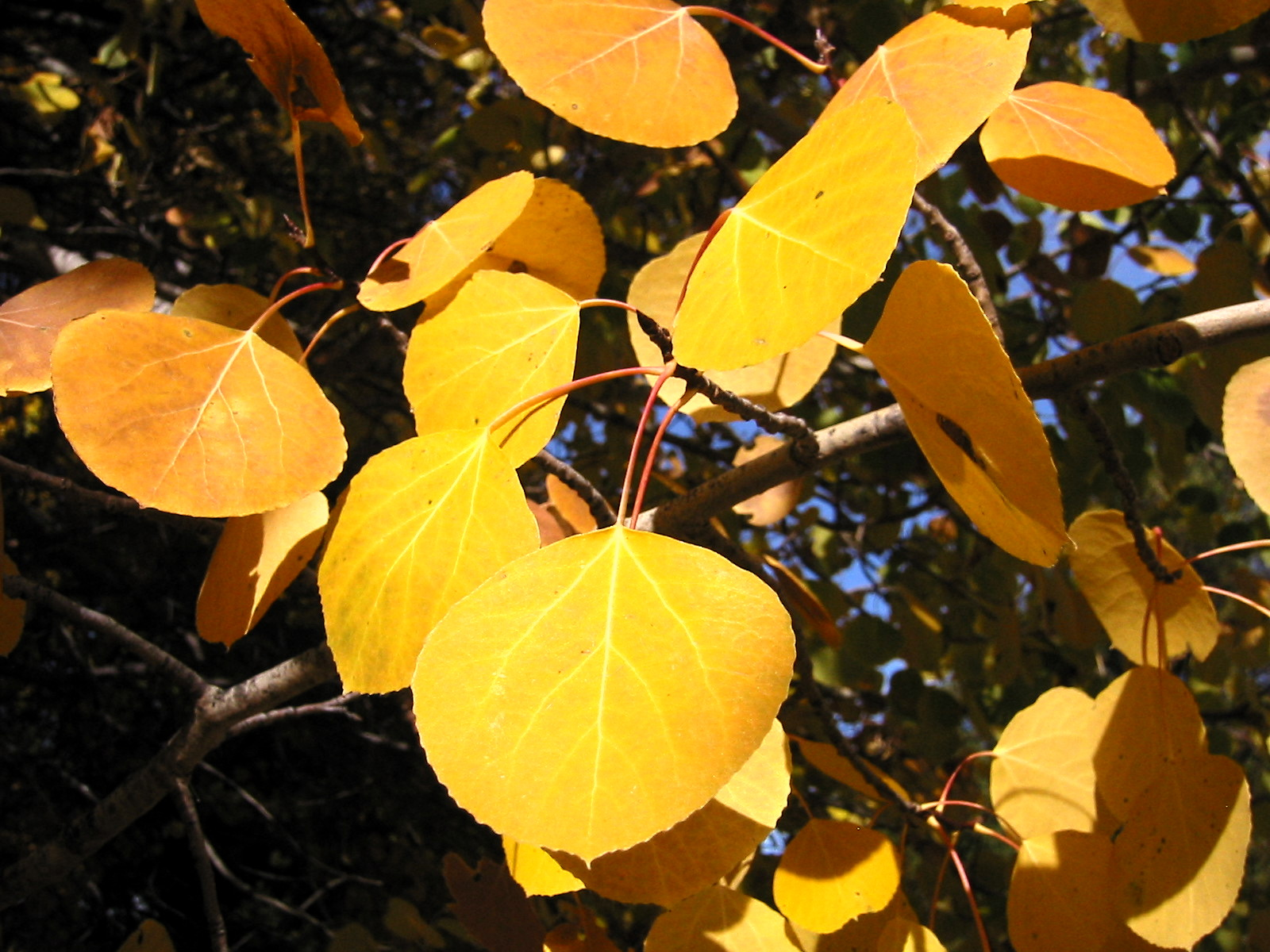
Typical yellow autumn foliage

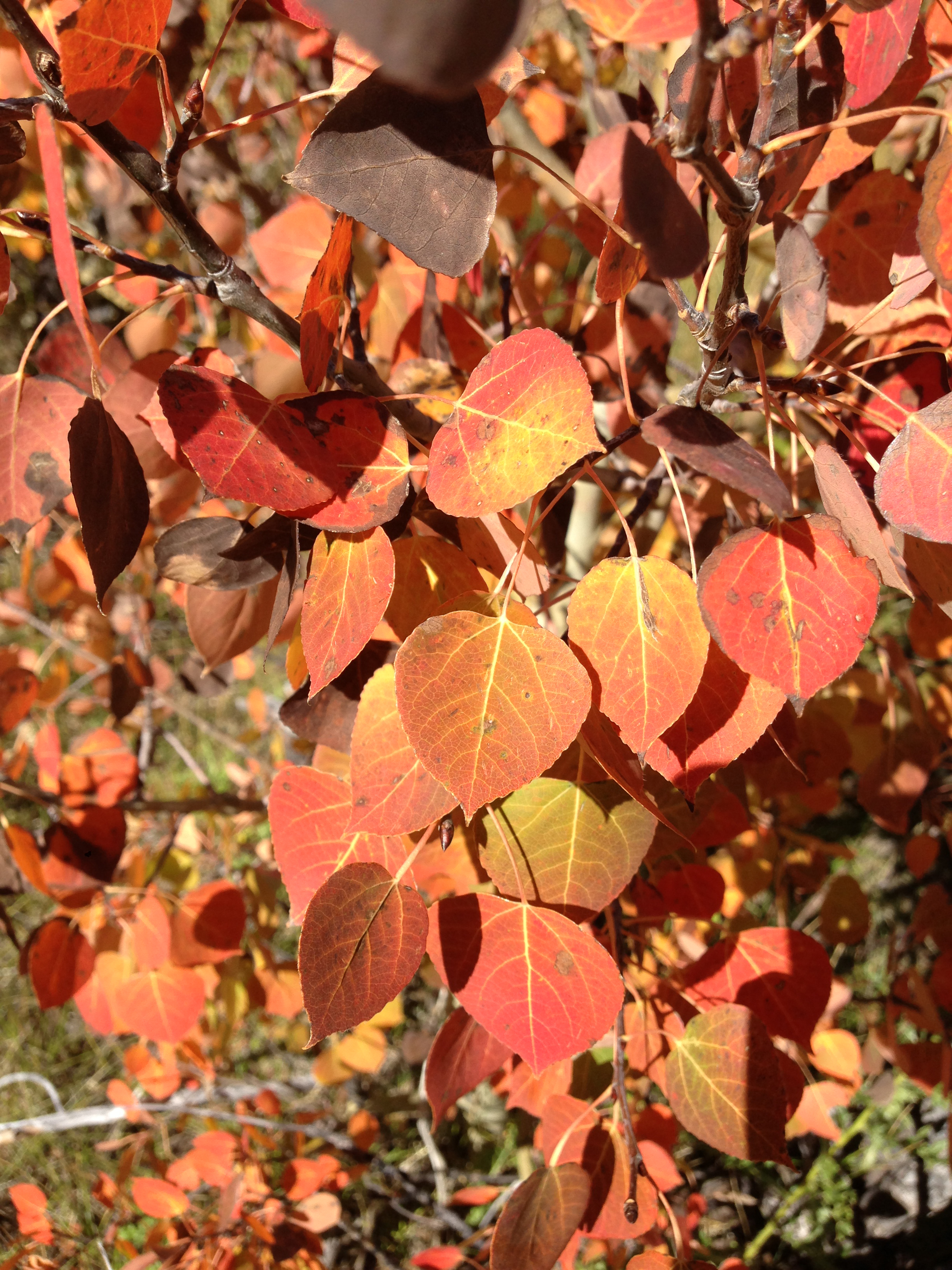
Atypical orange and red autumn foliage

Increased mortality in trembling aspen stands have been reported since the early 1990s across North America. As this accelerated in 2004, a debate over causes began. This increased dieback has been linked to multiple stressors, such as defoliation by the forest tent caterpillar (Malacosoma disstria), wood-boring beetles such as the poplar borer (Saperda calcarata) and the bronze poplar borer (Agrilus liragus), and fungal disturbances such as those by the Cytospora canker (Valsa sordida).

Many areas of the Western US have experienced increased diebacks which are often attributed to ungulate grazing and wildfire suppression. At high elevations where grasses can be rare, ungulates can browse young aspen sprouts and prevent those young trees from reaching maturity. As a result, some aspen groves close to cattle or other grazing animals, such as deer or elk, have very few young trees and can be invaded by conifers, which are not typically browsed. Another possible deterrent to aspen regeneration is widespread wildfire suppression. Aspens are vigorous resprouters and even though the above-ground portion of the organism may die in a wild-fire, the roots, which are often protected from lethal temperatures during a fire, will sprout new trees soon after a fire. Disturbances such as fires seem to be a necessary ecological event in order for aspens to compete with conifers, which tend to replace aspens over long, disturbance-free intervals. The current dieback in the American West may have roots in the strict fire suppression policy in the United States. On the other hand, the widespread decimation of conifer forests by the mountain pine beetle may provide increased opportunities for aspen groves to proliferate under the right conditions.

Increased mortality has also been linked in turn to climate change. Thaw-freeze events and light snowfall in late winter as a result of increased temperatures has led to increased dieback in Southern and Western Canada. Furthermore, climate records show that historically, most periods of aspen decline have been paired with periods of severe drought, which has worsened in recent years due to a changing climate. Many stands of aspen that have been affected by climate change in recent years have poor regeneration potential, leading to concerns of widespread loss of aspen cover in the future.

Because of vegetative regeneration by aspen, where an entire group of trees are essentially clones, there is a concern that something that hits one will eventually kill all of the trees, presuming they share the same vulnerability. A conference was held in Utah in September 2006 to share notes and consider investigative methodology.

== Uses ==
Aspen bark contains a substance that was extracted by indigenous North Americans and European settlers of the western U.S. as a quinine substitute.

Like other poplars, aspens make poor fuel wood, as they dry slowly, rot quickly, and do not give off much heat. Yet they are still widely used in campgrounds because they are cheap and plentiful and not widely used in building lumber. Pioneers in the North American west used them to create log cabins and dugouts, though they were not the preferred species.

Aspen wood is used for pulp products (its main application in Canada) such as books, newsprint, and fine printing paper. It is especially good for panel products such as oriented strand board and waferboard. It is light in weight and is used for furniture, boxes and crates, core stock in plywood, and wall panels.

== Culture and cultivation ==
The quaking aspen is the state tree of Utah.

The cultivar 'Prairie Gold' was introduced to the plant trade by the Nebraska Statewide Arboretum and a local nursery with a claim that it is better adapted the warmer conditions and lower humidity of lower elevations. It is rated as hardy only to USDA zone 4.

Typically, quaking aspens in cultivation are hardy in USDA zones 1 to 6. They require good drainage and moist or occasionally wet soils. With good drainage they adapt to clay, silt, sand, or shallowly rocky soil conditions.

== See also ==
- Pando, an exceptionally large clonal colony of P. tremuloides determined to be a single male tree
- Largest organisms
