= Saperda maculosa =

Scientific classification
- Domain: Eukaryota
- Kingdom: Animalia
- Phylum: Arthropoda
- Class: Insecta
- Order: Coleoptera
- Suborder: Polyphaga
- Infraorder: Cucujiformia
- Family: Cerambycidae
- Genus: Saperda
- Species: S. maculosa

Binomial name
- Saperda maculosa Ménétries, 1832

Synonyms
- Saperda scalaris maculosa (Ménétries) Pic, 1910

Species of beetle

Saperda maculosa is a species of beetle in the family Cerambycidae. It was described by Édouard Ménétries in 1832. It is known from Iran.
