= Saperda tetrastigma =

Scientific classification
- Domain: Eukaryota
- Kingdom: Animalia
- Phylum: Arthropoda
- Class: Insecta
- Order: Coleoptera
- Suborder: Polyphaga
- Infraorder: Cucujiformia
- Family: Cerambycidae
- Genus: Saperda
- Species: S. tetrastigma

Binomial name
- Saperda tetrastigma Bates, 1879

Synonyms
- Saperda (Lopezcolonia) tetrastigma Bates, 1879

Species of beetle

Saperda tetrastigma is a species of beetle in the family Cerambycidae. It was described by Henry Walter Bates in 1879. It is known from South Korea, Japan and Taiwan.
