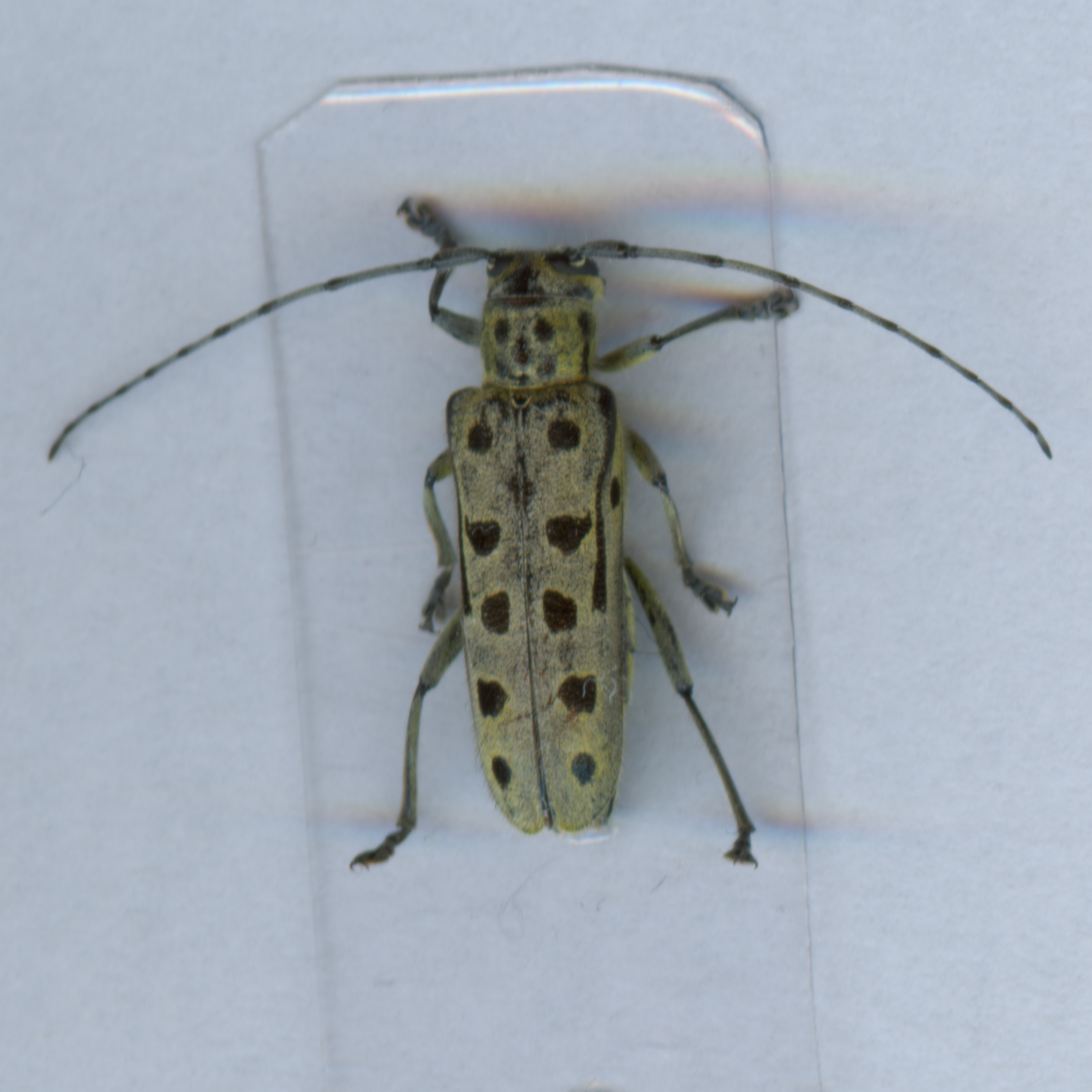

Scientific classification
- Domain: Eukaryota
- Kingdom: Animalia
- Phylum: Arthropoda
- Class: Insecta
- Order: Coleoptera
- Suborder: Polyphaga
- Infraorder: Cucujiformia
- Family: Cerambycidae
- Genus: Saperda
- Species: S. perforata

Binomial name
- Saperda perforata (Pallas, 1773)

Synonyms
- Cerambyx perforatus Pallas, 1773; Saperda cinerascens Hellen, 1922; Saperda (Lopezcolonia) perforata (Pallas) Sanchéz-Sobrino, 2000; Saperda seydilii Fröhlich, 1793; Leptura duodecimpunctata Brahm, 1790; Leptura decempunctata Goeze, 1777

= Saperda perforata =

Species of beetle

Saperda perforata is a species of beetle in the family Cerambycidae. It was described by Pallas in 1773, originally under the genus Cerambyx. It has a wide distribution in Europe. It feeds on Populus nigra, Populus alba, and Populus tremula. It is preyed upon by the parasitoid wasp Xorides indicatorius.

S. perforata measures between 12 and 20 mm (0.47 and 0.79 in).

== Varietas ==
- Saperda perforata var. paliidipes Pic
- Saperda perforata var. albella Reitter
- Saperda perforata var. rudolfi Caderhjolm, 1798
