= Saperda fayi =

Scientific classification
- Domain: Eukaryota
- Kingdom: Animalia
- Phylum: Arthropoda
- Class: Insecta
- Order: Coleoptera
- Suborder: Polyphaga
- Infraorder: Cucujiformia
- Family: Cerambycidae
- Genus: Saperda
- Species: S. fayi

Binomial name
- Saperda fayi Bland, 1863

Species of beetle

Saperda fayi is a species of beetle in the family Cerambycidae. It was described by Bland in 1863. It is known from Canada and the United States.

== Varietas ==
- Saperda fayi var. shoemakeri Davis, 1923
- Saperda fayi var. immaculipennis Breuning, 1952
