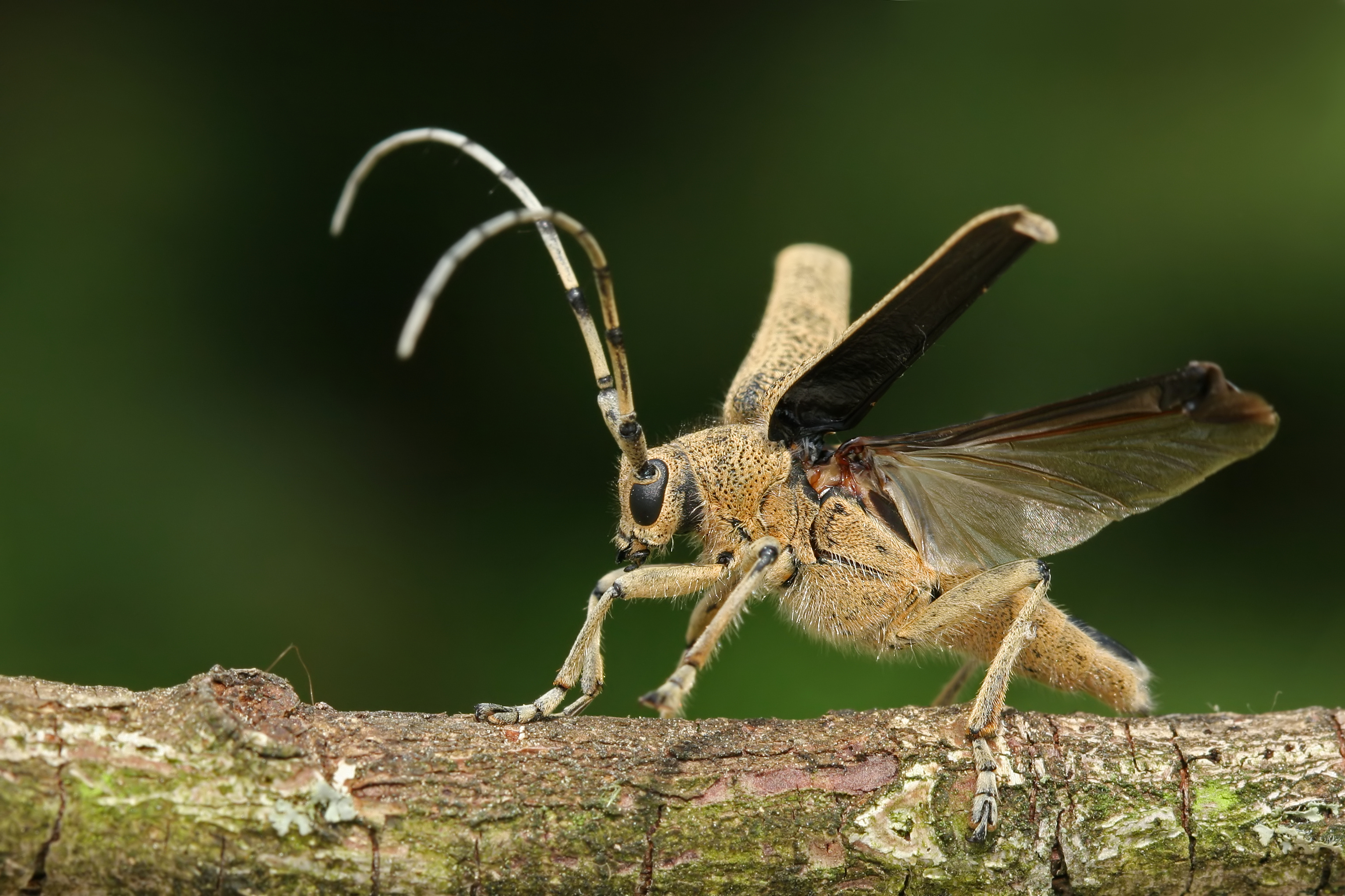

Scientific classification
- Kingdom: Animalia
- Phylum: Arthropoda
- Class: Insecta
- Order: Coleoptera
- Suborder: Polyphaga
- Infraorder: Cucujiformia
- Family: Cerambycidae
- Genus: Saperda
- Species: S. carcharias

Binomial name
- Saperda carcharias (Linnaeus, 1758)

Synonyms
- Cerambyx carcharias Linnaeus, 1758

= Saperda carcharias =

Species of beetle

Saperda carcharias is a species of longhorn beetle.

== Ecology ==
Saperda carcharias feeds almost exclusively on poplar trees, targeting the root zone.

== Taxonomy ==
Saperda carcharias was first described in 1758, when Carl Linnaeus included it in the 10th edition of his Systema Naturae, under the name Cerambyx carcharias. It was later chosen as the type species of a new genus, Saperda.
