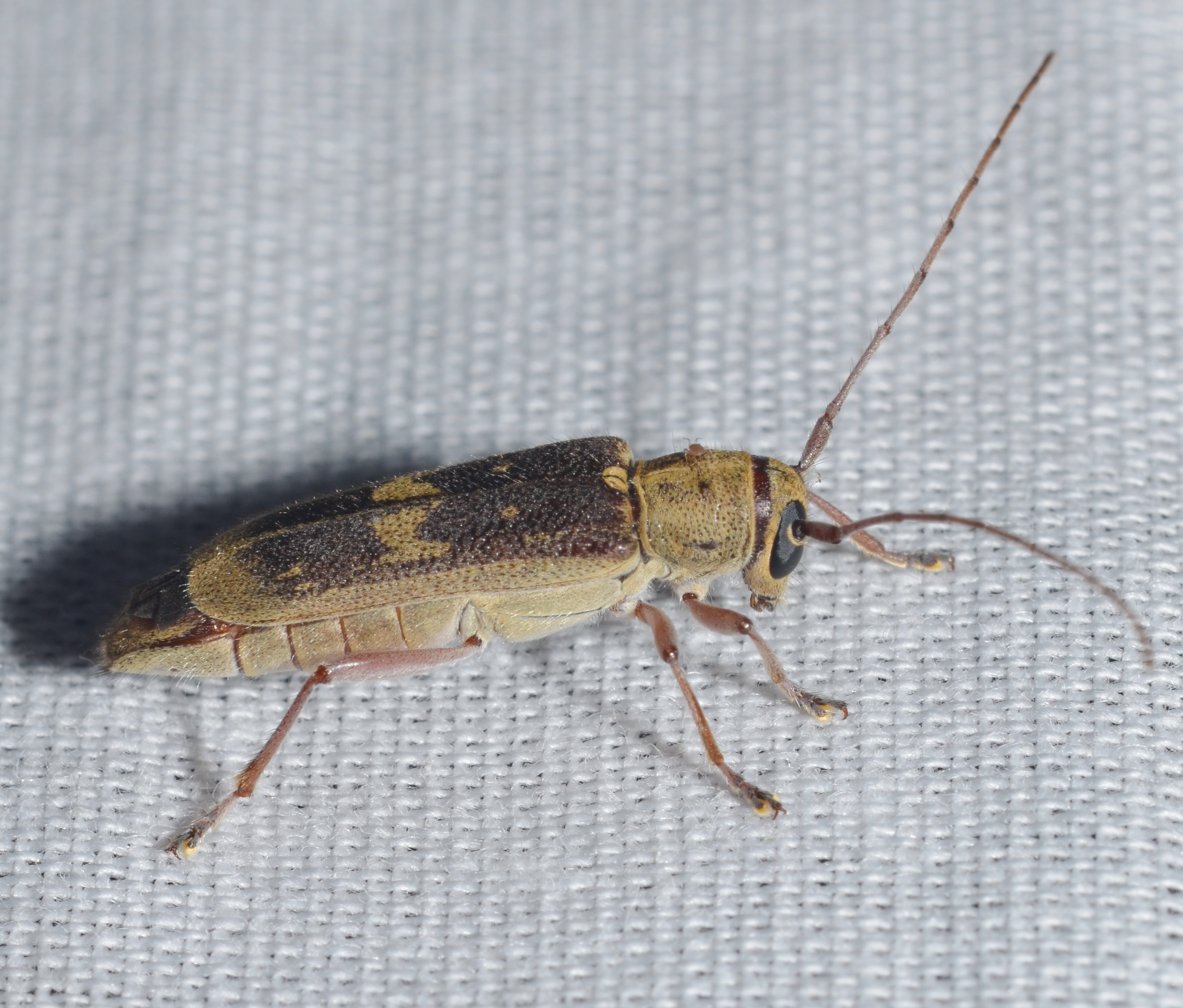
- Saperda discoidea

Scientific classification
- Kingdom: Animalia
- Phylum: Arthropoda
- Class: Insecta
- Order: Coleoptera
- Suborder: Polyphaga
- Infraorder: Cucujiformia
- Family: Cerambycidae
- Genus: Saperda
- Species: S. discoidea

Binomial name
- Saperda discoidea Fabricius, 1798

Synonyms
- Stenostola fuscipes (Say) Haldeman, 1847; Saperda fuscipes Say, 1827

= Saperda discoidea =

Species of beetle

Saperda discoidea is a species of beetle in the family Cerambycidae. It was described by Johan Christian Fabricius in 1798.
