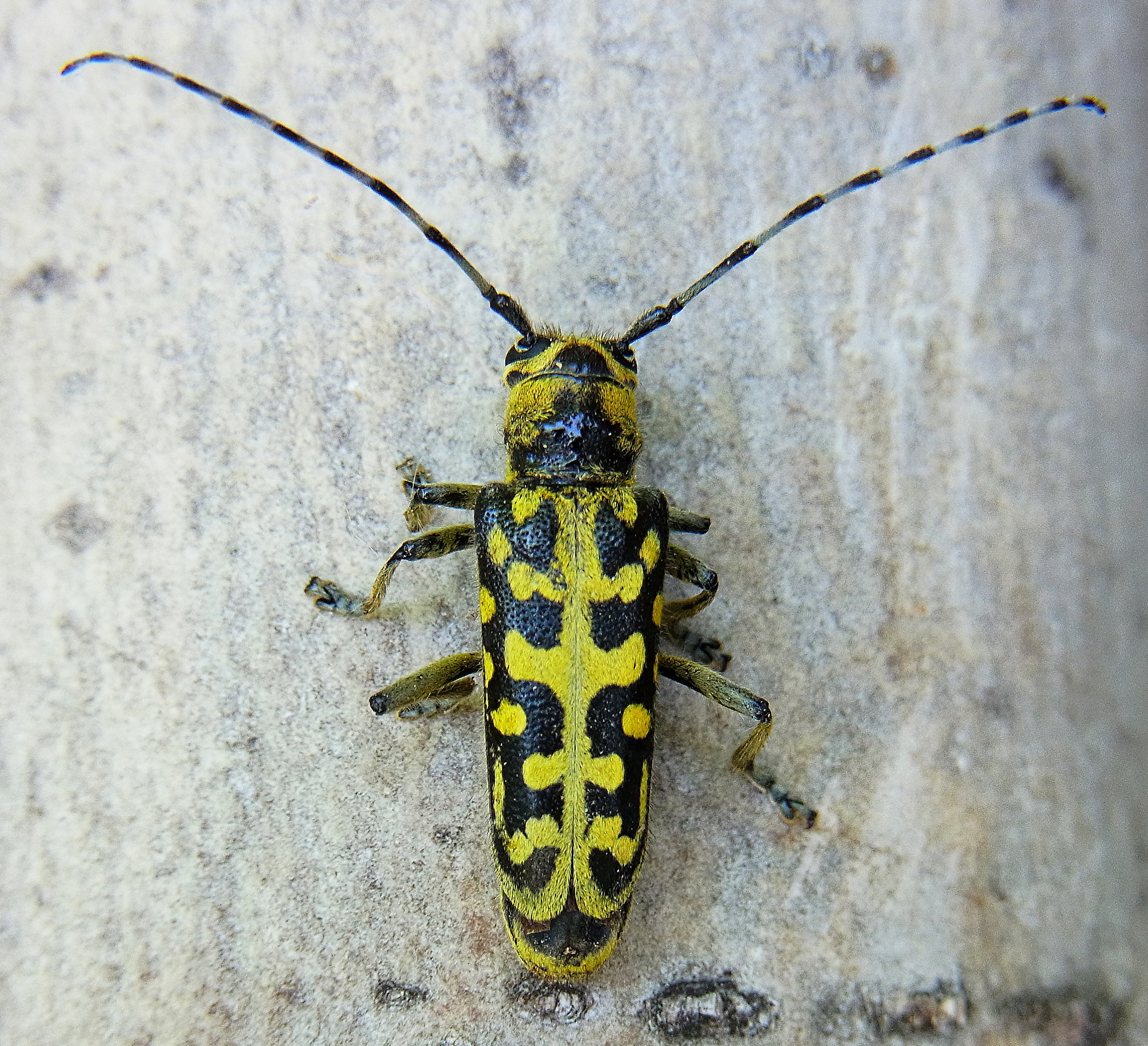

Scientific classification
- Kingdom: Animalia
- Phylum: Arthropoda
- Class: Insecta
- Order: Coleoptera
- Suborder: Polyphaga
- Infraorder: Cucujiformia
- Family: Cerambycidae
- Genus: Saperda
- Species: S. scalaris

Binomial name
- Saperda scalaris (Linnaeus, 1758)

Synonyms
- Lamia scalaris (Linnaeus, 1758); Cerambyx scalaris Linnaeus, 1758

= Saperda scalaris =

Species of beetle

Saperda scalaris is a species of beetle in the family Cerambycidae. It was described by Carl Linnaeus in 1758, originally under the genus Cerambyx. It has a wide distribution in Europe and Asia. It is preyed upon by parasitoid wasp species including Xorides praecatorius and Helcon angustator.

== Subspecies ==
- Saperda scalaris scalaris (Linnaeus, 1758)
- Saperda scalaris algeriensis Breuning, 1952
