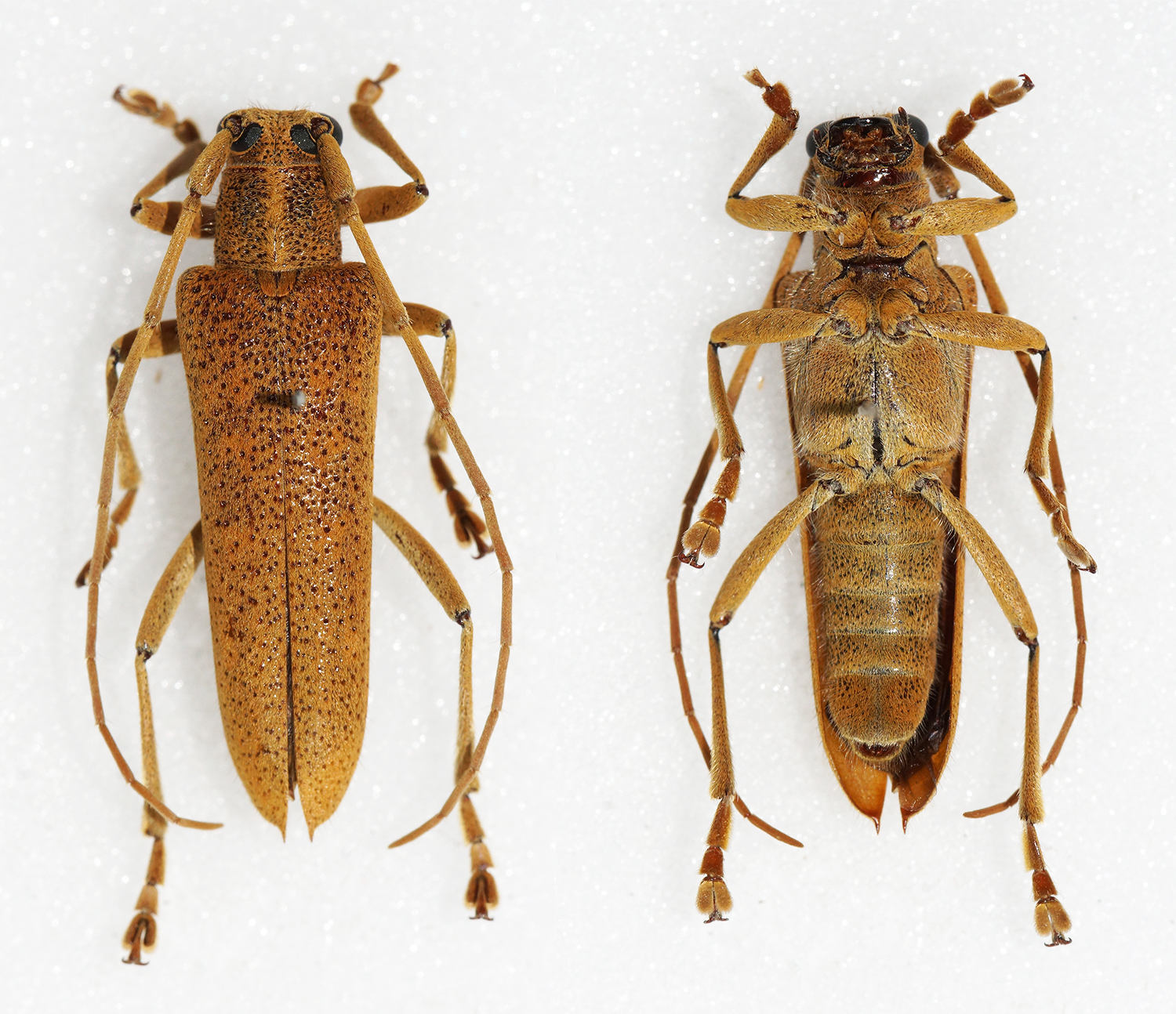

Scientific classification
- Kingdom: Animalia
- Phylum: Arthropoda
- Clade: Pancrustacea
- Class: Insecta
- Order: Coleoptera
- Suborder: Polyphaga
- Infraorder: Cucujiformia
- Family: Cerambycidae
- Genus: Saperda
- Species: S. calcarata

Binomial name
- Saperda calcarata Say, 1824

Synonyms
- Anaerea calcarata (Say, 1824)

= Saperda calcarata =

Species of beetle

Saperda calcarata, the poplar borer, is a species of beetle in the family Cerambycidae. It was described by Thomas Say in 1824. It is known from Canada and the United States. It contains the varietas Saperda calcarata var. adspersa.
