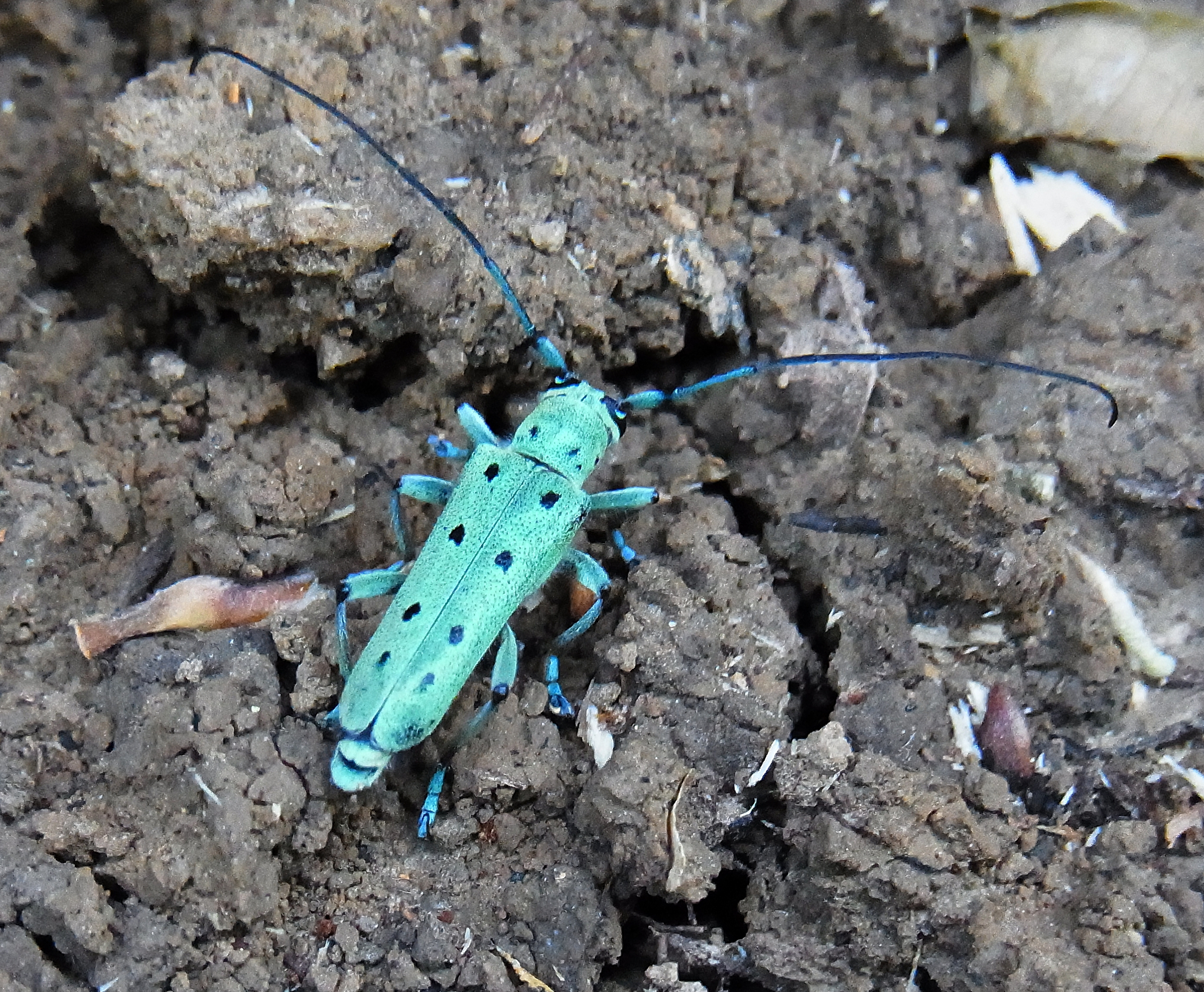

Scientific classification
- Domain: Eukaryota
- Kingdom: Animalia
- Phylum: Arthropoda
- Class: Insecta
- Order: Coleoptera
- Suborder: Polyphaga
- Infraorder: Cucujiformia
- Family: Cerambycidae
- Genus: Saperda
- Species: S. octopunctata

Binomial name
- Saperda octopunctata (Scopoli, 1772)

Synonyms
- Leptura octopunctata Scopoli, 1772; Cerambyx tremulus (Fabricius, 1775); Saperda tiliae Schrank, 1798; Saperda (Argalia) octopunctata (Scopoli, 1772); Saperda tremulae (Fabricius, 1775); Saperda tremula Fabricius, 1775; Lopezcolonia octopunctata (Scopoli, 1772)

= Saperda octopunctata =

Species of beetle

Saperda octopunctata is a species of beetle in the family Cerambycidae, and the type species of its genus. It was described by Scopoli in 1772, originally under the genus Leptura. It has a wide distribution in Europe. It feeds on Populus tremula.

S. octopunctata measures between 13 and 18 mm (0.51 and 0.71 in).
