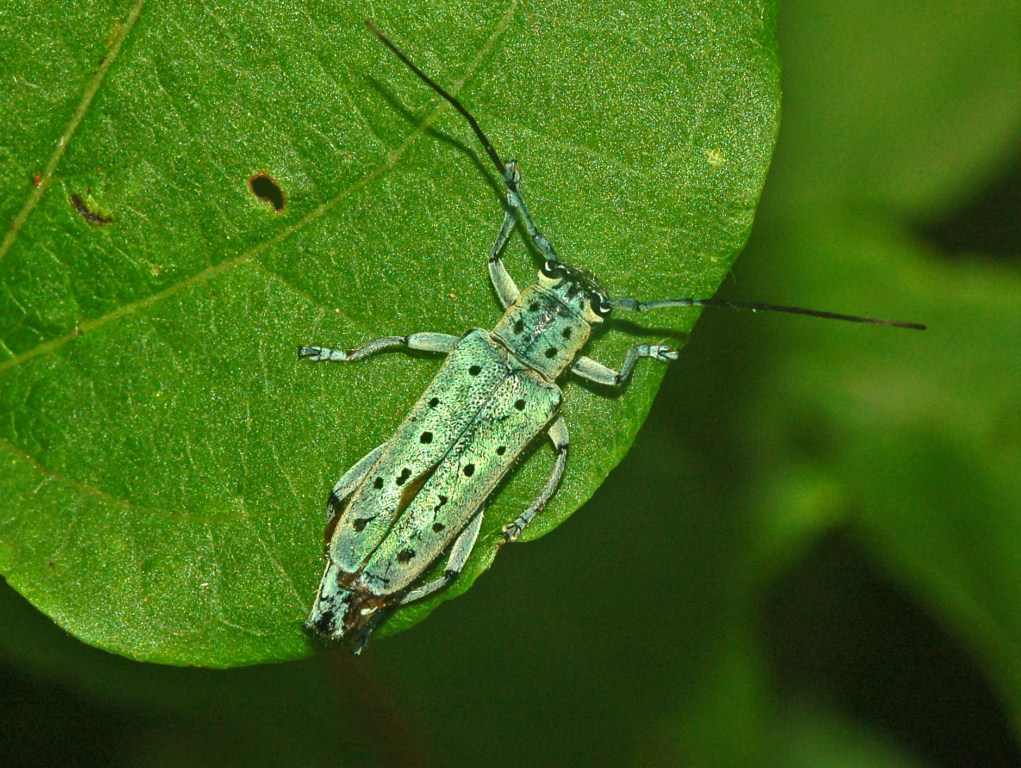
- Female Saperda punctata

Scientific classification
- Domain: Eukaryota
- Kingdom: Animalia
- Phylum: Arthropoda
- Class: Insecta
- Order: Coleoptera
- Suborder: Polyphaga
- Infraorder: Cucujiformia
- Family: Cerambycidae
- Subfamily: Lamiinae
- Tribe: Saperdini
- Genus: Saperda; Fabricius, 1775

Synonyms
- Anaerea Mulsant, 1839; Compsidia Mulsant, 1839; Amilia Mulsant, 1863; Saperda (Argalia) Mulsant, 1863 nec Gray, 1846; Saperdopsis Schmidt, 1967 nec Thomson, 1864; Lopezcolonia Alonso-Zarazaga, 1998

= Saperda =

Genus of beetles

Saperda is a genus of flat-faced longhorn beetles belonging to the family Cerambycidae, subfamily Lamiinae. The genus was erected by Johan Christian Fabricius in 1775.

== Species ==
- Saperda alberti Plavilstshikov, 1916
- Saperda bacillicornis Pesarini & Sabbadini, 1997
- Saperda balsamifera (Motschulsky, 1860)
- Saperda bilineatocollis Pic, 1924
- Saperda calcarata Say, 1824 - poplar borer
- Saperda candida Fabricius, 1787 - roundheaded appletree borer
- Saperda carcharias (Linnaeus, 1758)
- Saperda cretata Newman, 1838
- Saperda discoidea Fabricius, 1798
- Saperda facetula Holzschuh, 1999
- Saperda fayi Bland, 1863
- †Saperda florissantensis Wickham, 1916
- Saperda gilanensis (Shapovalov, 2013)
- Saperda gleneoides Breuning, 1950
- Saperda horni Joutel, 1902
- Saperda hosokawai Hasegawa, 2017
- Saperda imitans Felt & Joutel, 1904
- Saperda inornata Say, 1824
- Saperda internescalaris Pic, 1934
- Saperda interrupta Gebler, 1825
- Saperda kojimai Makihara & Nakamura, 1985
- Saperda lateralis Fabricius, 1775
- Saperda maculosa Ménétriés, 1832
- Saperda mariangelae Pesarini & Sabbadini, 2015
- Saperda messageei Breuning, 1962
- Saperda moesta LeConte, 1850
- Saperda mutica Say, 1824
- Saperda obliqua Say, 1826
- Saperda octomaculata Blessig, 1873
- Saperda octopunctata (Scopoli, 1772)
- Saperda ohbayashii Podany, 1963
- Saperda pallidipennis Gressitt, 1951
- Saperda perforata (Pallas, 1773)
- Saperda populnea (Linnaeus, 1758)
- Saperda punctata (Linnaeus, 1767)
- Saperda puncticollis Say, 1824
- Saperda quercus Charpentier, 1825
- †Saperda robusta (Schmidt, 1967)
- Saperda scalaris (Linnaeus, 1758)
- Saperda similis Laicharting, 1784
- Saperda simulans Gahan, 1888
- Saperda subobliterata Pic, 1910
- Saperda subscalaris Breuning, 1952
- Saperda tetrastigma Bates, 1879
- Saperda tridentata Olivier, 1795 - elm borer
- Saperda vestita Say, 1824 - linden borer
- Saperda viridipennis Gressitt, 1951
