= Cleptometopus fisheri =

Scientific classification
- Kingdom: Animalia
- Phylum: Arthropoda
- Class: Insecta
- Order: Coleoptera
- Suborder: Polyphaga
- Infraorder: Cucujiformia
- Family: Cerambycidae
- Genus: Cleptometopus
- Species: C. fisheri

Binomial name
- Cleptometopus fisheri Gardner, 1941

Species of beetle

Cleptometopus fisheri is a species of beetle in the family Cerambycidae. It was described by Gardner in 1941.
