= Oberea artocarpi =

Scientific classification
- Domain: Eukaryota
- Kingdom: Animalia
- Phylum: Arthropoda
- Class: Insecta
- Order: Coleoptera
- Suborder: Polyphaga
- Infraorder: Cucujiformia
- Family: Cerambycidae
- Genus: Oberea
- Species: O. artocarpi

Binomial name
- Oberea artocarpi Gardner, 1941

Species of beetle

Oberea artocarpi is a species of flat-faced longhorn beetle in the tribe Saperdini in the genus Oberea, discovered by Gardner in 1941.
