= Eunidia xyliae =

Scientific classification
- Kingdom: Animalia
- Phylum: Arthropoda
- Clade: Pancrustacea
- Class: Insecta
- Order: Coleoptera
- Suborder: Polyphaga
- Infraorder: Cucujiformia
- Family: Cerambycidae
- Genus: Eunidia
- Species: E. xyliae

Binomial name
- Eunidia xyliae Gardner, 1941

Species of beetle

Eunidia xyliae is a species of beetle in the family Cerambycidae. It was described by Gardner in 1941. It is known from Myanmar.
