= Acalolepta inaequalis =

Scientific classification
- Domain: Eukaryota
- Kingdom: Animalia
- Phylum: Arthropoda
- Class: Insecta
- Order: Coleoptera
- Suborder: Polyphaga
- Infraorder: Cucujiformia
- Family: Cerambycidae
- Tribe: Lamiini
- Genus: Acalolepta
- Species: A. inaequalis

Binomial name
- Acalolepta inaequalis (Gardner, 1937)

Synonyms
- Dihammus inaequalis Gardner, 1937

Species of beetle

Acalolepta inaequalis is a species of beetle in the family Cerambycidae. It was described by James Clark Molesworth Gardner in 1937. It is known from India.
