= Serixia andamanica =

Scientific classification
- Domain: Eukaryota
- Kingdom: Animalia
- Phylum: Arthropoda
- Class: Insecta
- Order: Coleoptera
- Suborder: Polyphaga
- Infraorder: Cucujiformia
- Family: Cerambycidae
- Subfamily: Lamiinae
- Tribe: Saperdini
- Genus: Serixia
- Species: S. andamanica

Binomial name
- Serixia andamanica Gardner, 1930

Species of beetle

Serixia andamanica is a species of beetle in the family Cerambycidae. It was described by James Clark Molesworth Gardner in 1963.
