= Glenea plagiata =

Scientific classification
- Domain: Eukaryota
- Kingdom: Animalia
- Phylum: Arthropoda
- Class: Insecta
- Order: Coleoptera
- Suborder: Polyphaga
- Infraorder: Cucujiformia
- Family: Cerambycidae
- Genus: Glenea
- Species: G. plagiata

Binomial name
- Glenea plagiata Gardner, 1930

Species of beetle

Glenea plagiata is a species of beetle in the family Cerambycidae. It was described by Gardner in 1930.
