= Serixia coomani =

Scientific classification
- Kingdom: Animalia
- Phylum: Arthropoda
- Class: Insecta
- Order: Coleoptera
- Suborder: Polyphaga
- Infraorder: Cucujiformia
- Family: Cerambycidae
- Subfamily: Lamiinae
- Tribe: Saperdini
- Genus: Serixia
- Species: S. coomani

Binomial name
- Serixia coomani Pic, 1929

Species of beetle

Serixia coomani is a species of beetle in the family Cerambycidae. It was described by Maurice Pic in 1929.
