= Serixia sedata =

Scientific classification
- Domain: Eukaryota
- Kingdom: Animalia
- Phylum: Arthropoda
- Class: Insecta
- Order: Coleoptera
- Suborder: Polyphaga
- Infraorder: Cucujiformia
- Family: Cerambycidae
- Subfamily: Lamiinae
- Tribe: Saperdini
- Genus: Serixia
- Species: S. sedata

Binomial name
- Serixia sedata Pascoe, 1862

Species of beetle

Serixia sedata is a species of beetle in the family Cerambycidae. It was described by Francis Polkinghorne Pascoe in 1862.

== Subspecies ==
- Serixia sedata occidentalis Breuning, 1950
- Serixia sedata gigantea Breuning, 1950
- Serixia sedata sedata Pascoe, 1862
