= Serixia =

Scientific classification
- Kingdom: Animalia
- Phylum: Arthropoda
- Clade: Pancrustacea
- Class: Insecta
- Order: Coleoptera
- Suborder: Polyphaga
- Infraorder: Cucujiformia
- Family: Cerambycidae
- Tribe: Saperdini
- Genus: Serixia; Pascoe, 1856

Type species
- Serixia apicalis Pascoe, 1856

Genus of beetles

Serixia is a genus of longhorn beetles of the subfamily Lamiinae, containing the following species:

subgenus Nigroserixia

- Serixia atripes Breuning, 1958

subgenus Serixia

- Serixia affinis Aurivillius, 1927
- Serixia albertisi Breuning, 1950
- Serixia albofemorata Aurivillius, 1927
- Serixia albopleura Gressitt, 1935
- Serixia albosternalis Breuning, 1958
- Serixia andamanensis Breuning, 1958
- Serixia andamanica Gardner, 1963
- Serixia annulata Breuning, 1958
- Serixia anterufa Breuning, 1961
- Serixia apicalis Pascoe, 1856
- Serixia apicenigra Breuning, 1958
- Serixia argentea Aurivillius, 1922
- Serixia argenteifrons Breuning, 1958
- Serixia argenteipennis Breuning, 1950
- Serixia assamana Breuning, 1967
- Serixia assamensis Breuning, 1958
- Serixia atra Pic, 1936
- Serixia atritarsis Pic, 1929
- Serixia atroapicalis Breuning, 1953
- Serixia auratoides Breuning, 1958
- Serixia aureosplendens Breuning, 1958
- Serixia aureovittata Breuning, 1958
- Serixia aurescens Breuning, 1965
- Serixia aurulenta Pascoe, 1867
- Serixia bakeri Breuning, 1959
- Serixia basalis Pascoe, 1866
- Serixia basilana Breuning, 1959
- Serixia basirufa Breuning, 1950
- Serixia batchianensis Breuning, 1958
- Serixia bihamata Aurivillius, 1927
- Serixia binhensis Breuning, 1958
- Serixia bootangana Breuning, 1958
- Serixia botelensis Kano, 1933
- Serixia buruensis Breuning, 1958
- Serixia cavifrons Aurivillius, 1927
- Serixia cebuensis Breuning, 1958
- Serixia celebensis Breuning, 1958
- Serixia celebiana Breuning, 1958
- Serixia cephalotes Pascoe, 1862
- Serixia ceylonica Breuning, 1958
- Serixia cheesmani Breuning, 1961
- Serixia chinensis Breuning, 1948
- Serixia cinereotomentosa Breuning, 1958
- Serixia coomani Pic, 1929
- Serixia corporaali Breuning, 1950
- Serixia cupida Pascoe, 1867
- Serixia curta Breuning, 1950
- Serixia dapitana Breuning, 1960
- Serixia densevestita Breuning, 1950
- Serixia discoidalis Pic, 1936
- Serixia elegans Aurivillius, 1927
- Serixia elongatula Breuning, 1950
- Serixia flavicans Breuning, 1950
- Serixia formosana Breuning, 1960
- Serixia fulvida Pascoe, 1867
- Serixia fuscotibialis Breuning, 1958
- Serixia fuscovittata Breuning, 1963
- Serixia griseipennis Gressitt, 1938
- Serixia histrio (Pascoe, 1859)
- Serixia impuncticollis Breuning, 1963
- Serixia inapicalis Pic, 1928
- Serixia inconspicua Gardiner, 1936
- Serixia javanica Breuning, 1950
- Serixia khasiana Breuning, 1958
- Serixia kisana (Matsushita, 1937)
- Serixia laosensis Breuning, 1958
- Serixia laticeps Pic, 1928
- Serixia latitarsis Breuning, 1958
- Serixia literata (Pascoe, 1858)
- Serixia longicornis (Pascoe, 1858)
- Serixia malaccana Breuning, 1958
- Serixia marginata Pascoe, 1867
- Serixia matangensis Breuning, 1958
- Serixia maxima Breuning, 1963
- Serixia menadensis Breuning, 1960
- Serixia merangensis Breuning, 1958
- Serixia microphthalma Breuning, 1958
- Serixia mindanaonis Aurivillius, 1927
- Serixia mindoroensis Breuning, 1960
- Serixia modesta Pascoe, 1856
- Serixia modiglianii Breuning, 1958
- Serixia mortyana Breuning, 1958
- Serixia multipunctata Breuning, 1958
- Serixia nicobarica Breuning, 1958
- Serixia nigricornis Breuning, 1958
- Serixia nigripennis Breuning, 1955
- Serixia nigritarsis Breuning, 1950
- Serixia nigroapicalis Aurivillius, 1927
- Serixia nigrofasciata Pic, 1926
- Serixia nigrolateralis Breuning, 1958
- Serixia nigrotibialis Breuning, 1950
- Serixia nilghirica Breuning, 1963
- Serixia niveotomentosa Aurivillius, 1927
- Serixia novaebritanniae Breuning, 1958
- Serixia optabilis Pascoe, 1867
- Serixia ornata Pascoe, 1862
- Serixia palliata Pascoe, 1867
- Serixia phaeoptera Aurivillius, 1927
- Serixia plagiata Aurivillius, 1927
- Serixia praeusta Pascoe, 1867
- Serixia prasinata Pascoe, 1866
- Serixia prolata (Pascoe, 1858)
- Serixia proxima (Pascoe, 1859)
- Serixia pseudoplagiata Breuning, 1950
- Serixia pubescens Gressitt, 1940
- Serixia puncticollis Breuning, 1960
- Serixia punctipennis Breuning, 1950
- Serixia quadrina Pascoe, 1867
- Serixia quadriplagiata Aurivillius, 1927
- Serixia ranauensis Hayashi, 1975
- Serixia robusta Breuning, 1950
- Serixia rondoni Breuning, 1962
- Serixia rufobasipennis Breuning, 1964
- Serixia rufula Breuning, 1950
- Serixia salomonum Breuning, 1958
- Serixia sandakana Breuning, 1958
- Serixia sarawakensis Breuning, 1958
- Serixia sedata Pascoe, 1862
- Serixia sericeipennis Breuning, 1963
- Serixia signaticornis Schwarzer, 1925
- Serixia simplex (Aurivillius, 1927)
- Serixia singaporana Breuning, 1958
- Serixia sinica Gressitt, 1937
- Serixia spinipennis Breuning, 1961
- Serixia subaurea Aurivillius, 1922
- Serixia subelongata Pic, 1936
- Serixia sumatrana Breuning, 1958
- Serixia testaceicollis Kano, 1933
- Serixia thailandensis Villiers & Chujo, 1962
- Serixia trigonocephala (Heller, 1915)
- Serixia triplagiata Breuning, 1955
- Serixia truncata Breuning, 1958
- Serixia truncatipennis Breuning, 1950
- Serixia uniformis (Heller, 1915)
- Serixia varians Pascoe, 1866
- Serixia variantennalis Breuning, 1960
- Serixia variicornis Breuning, 1958
- Serixia varioscapus (Heller, 1915)
- Serixia vateriae Gardner, 1936
- Serixia vitticollis Breuning, 1958
- Serixia woodlarkiana Breuning, 1958

subgenus Xyaste

- Serixia finita (Pascoe, 1867)
- Serixia fumosa (Pascoe, 1867)
- Serixia invida (Pascoe, 1867)
- Serixia nigripes (Pascoe, 1858)
- Serixia paradoxa (Pascoe, 1867)
- Serixia paradoxoides Breuning, 1958
- Serixia rubripennis Pic, 1931
- Serixia semiusta (Pascoe, 1867)
- Serixia torrida (Pascoe, 1867)
