= Serixia nigripes =

Scientific classification
- Domain: Eukaryota
- Kingdom: Animalia
- Phylum: Arthropoda
- Class: Insecta
- Order: Coleoptera
- Suborder: Polyphaga
- Infraorder: Cucujiformia
- Family: Cerambycidae
- Genus: Serixia
- Species: S. nigripes

Binomial name
- Serixia nigripes (Pascoe, 1858)

Synonyms
- Iole nigripes Pascoe, 1858; Xyaste subminiacea (Pascoe, 1867); Xyaste nigripes (Pascoe) Pascoe, 1866; Serixia subminiacea Pascoe, 1867

Species of beetle

Serixia nigripes is a species of beetle in the family Cerambycidae. It was described by Francis Polkinghorne Pascoe in 1858. It is known from Malaysia.
