= Cleptometopus terrestris =

Scientific classification
- Kingdom: Animalia
- Phylum: Arthropoda
- Class: Insecta
- Order: Coleoptera
- Suborder: Polyphaga
- Infraorder: Cucujiformia
- Family: Cerambycidae
- Genus: Cleptometopus
- Species: C. terrestris

Binomial name
- Cleptometopus terrestris J. Thomson, 1864

Species of beetle

Cleptometopus terrestris is a species of beetle in the family Cerambycidae. It was described by J. Thomson in 1864.
