= Serixia thailandensis =

Scientific classification
- Kingdom: Animalia
- Phylum: Arthropoda
- Class: Insecta
- Order: Coleoptera
- Suborder: Polyphaga
- Infraorder: Cucujiformia
- Family: Cerambycidae
- Subfamily: Lamiinae
- Tribe: Saperdini
- Genus: Serixia
- Species: S. thailandensis

Binomial name
- Serixia thailandensis Breuning & Chûjô, 1962

Species of beetle

Serixia thailandensis is a species of beetle in the family Cerambycidae. It was described by Villiers and Chujo in 1962.
