= Cleptometopus scutellatus =

Scientific classification
- Kingdom: Animalia
- Phylum: Arthropoda
- Class: Insecta
- Order: Coleoptera
- Suborder: Polyphaga
- Infraorder: Cucujiformia
- Family: Cerambycidae
- Genus: Cleptometopus
- Species: C. scutellatus

Binomial name
- Cleptometopus scutellatus Hüdepohl, 1996

Species of beetle

Cleptometopus scutellatus is a species of beetle in the family Cerambycidae. It was described by Hüdepohl in 1996.
