= Serixia longicornis =

Scientific classification
- Domain: Eukaryota
- Kingdom: Animalia
- Phylum: Arthropoda
- Class: Insecta
- Order: Coleoptera
- Suborder: Polyphaga
- Infraorder: Cucujiformia
- Family: Cerambycidae
- Genus: Serixia
- Species: S. longicornis

Binomial name
- Serixia longicornis (Pascoe, 1858)

Species of beetle

Serixia longicornis is a species of beetle in the family Cerambycidae. It was described by Francis Polkinghorne Pascoe in 1858.
