= Cleptometopus camuripes =

Scientific classification
- Kingdom: Animalia
- Phylum: Arthropoda
- Class: Insecta
- Order: Coleoptera
- Suborder: Polyphaga
- Infraorder: Cucujiformia
- Family: Cerambycidae
- Genus: Cleptometopus
- Species: C. camuripes

Binomial name
- Cleptometopus camuripes (Newman, 1842)

Species of beetle

Cleptometopus camuripes is a species of beetle in the family Cerambycidae. It was described by Newman in 1842.
