= Cleptometopus enganensis =

Scientific classification
- Kingdom: Animalia
- Phylum: Arthropoda
- Clade: Pancrustacea
- Class: Insecta
- Order: Coleoptera
- Suborder: Polyphaga
- Infraorder: Cucujiformia
- Family: Cerambycidae
- Genus: Cleptometopus
- Species: C. enganensis

Binomial name
- Cleptometopus enganensis Gahan, 1907

Species of beetle

Cleptometopus enganensis is a species of beetle in the family Cerambycidae. It was described by Gahan in 1907. In Indonesia, this species is found in Sumatra, Java, and Borneo. It lives among leaf litter.

They are dark brown and the head has two ocelli.

They have a hearing range of 60 m and a visual range of 10–20 m. They fly rapidly and feed on decaying vegetative matter and insects.

They are associated with the ebony trees and the iris tree.
