= Serixia testaceicollis =

Scientific classification
- Domain: Eukaryota
- Kingdom: Animalia
- Phylum: Arthropoda
- Class: Insecta
- Order: Coleoptera
- Suborder: Polyphaga
- Infraorder: Cucujiformia
- Family: Cerambycidae
- Subfamily: Lamiinae
- Tribe: Saperdini
- Genus: Serixia
- Species: S. testaceicollis

Binomial name
- Serixia testaceicollis Kano, 1933

Species of beetle

Serixia testaceicollis is a species of beetle in the family Cerambycidae. It was described by Kano in 1933.
