= Cleptometopus sericeus =

Scientific classification
- Kingdom: Animalia
- Phylum: Arthropoda
- Class: Insecta
- Order: Coleoptera
- Suborder: Polyphaga
- Infraorder: Cucujiformia
- Family: Cerambycidae
- Genus: Cleptometopus
- Species: C. sericeus

Binomial name
- Cleptometopus sericeus Gahan, 1895

Species of beetle

Cleptometopus sericeus is a species of beetle in the family Cerambycidae. It was described by Gahan in 1895.
