= Serixia palliata =

Scientific classification
- Kingdom: Animalia
- Phylum: Arthropoda
- Class: Insecta
- Order: Coleoptera
- Suborder: Polyphaga
- Infraorder: Cucujiformia
- Family: Cerambycidae
- Genus: Serixia
- Species: S. palliata

Binomial name
- Serixia palliata (Pascoe, 1867)

Species of beetle

Serixia palliata is a species of beetle in the family Cerambycidae. It was described by Francis Polkinghorne Pascoe in 1867.
