= Serixia nigroapicalis =

Scientific classification
- Domain: Eukaryota
- Kingdom: Animalia
- Phylum: Arthropoda
- Class: Insecta
- Order: Coleoptera
- Suborder: Polyphaga
- Infraorder: Cucujiformia
- Family: Cerambycidae
- Subfamily: Lamiinae
- Tribe: Saperdini
- Genus: Serixia
- Species: S. nigroapicalis

Binomial name
- Serixia nigroapicalis Aurivillius, 1927

Species of beetle

Serixia nigroapicalis is a species of long horn beetle in the family Cerambycidae. It was described by Per Olof Christopher Aurivillius in 1927. This species is also part of the genus Serixia, order Coleoptera, class Insecta, phylum Arthropoda, and kingdom Animalia. These beetles can drill into wood and cause damage to live wood.
