= Serixia rubripennis =

Scientific classification
- Kingdom: Animalia
- Phylum: Arthropoda
- Class: Insecta
- Order: Coleoptera
- Suborder: Polyphaga
- Infraorder: Cucujiformia
- Family: Cerambycidae
- Subfamily: Lamiinae
- Tribe: Saperdini
- Genus: Serixia
- Species: S. rubripennis

Binomial name
- Serixia rubripennis Pic, 1929

Species of beetle

Serixia rubripennis is a species of beetle in the family Cerambycidae. It was described by Maurice Pic in 1931.
