= Serixia inconspicua =

Scientific classification
- Domain: Eukaryota
- Kingdom: Animalia
- Phylum: Arthropoda
- Class: Insecta
- Order: Coleoptera
- Suborder: Polyphaga
- Infraorder: Cucujiformia
- Family: Cerambycidae
- Subfamily: Lamiinae
- Tribe: Saperdini
- Genus: Serixia
- Species: S. inconspicua

Binomial name
- Serixia inconspicua Gardner, 1936

Species of beetle

Serixia inconspicua is a species of beetle in the family Cerambycidae. It was described by Gardiner in 1936.
