= Serixia optabilis =

Scientific classification
- Domain: Eukaryota
- Kingdom: Animalia
- Phylum: Arthropoda
- Class: Insecta
- Order: Coleoptera
- Suborder: Polyphaga
- Infraorder: Cucujiformia
- Family: Cerambycidae
- Subfamily: Lamiinae
- Tribe: Saperdini
- Genus: Serixia
- Species: S. optabilis

Binomial name
- Serixia optabilis Pascoe, 1867

Species of beetle

Serixia optabilis is a species of beetle in the family Cerambycidae. It was described by Francis Polkinghorne Pascoe in 1867.
