= Serixia griseipennis =

Scientific classification
- Domain: Eukaryota
- Kingdom: Animalia
- Phylum: Arthropoda
- Class: Insecta
- Order: Coleoptera
- Suborder: Polyphaga
- Infraorder: Cucujiformia
- Family: Cerambycidae
- Genus: Serixia
- Species: S. griseipennis

Binomial name
- Serixia griseipennis Gressitt, 1938

Species of beetle

Serixia griseipennis is a species of beetle in the family Cerambycidae. It was described by Gressitt in 1938.
