= Cleptometopus simillimus =

Scientific classification
- Kingdom: Animalia
- Phylum: Arthropoda
- Class: Insecta
- Order: Coleoptera
- Suborder: Polyphaga
- Infraorder: Cucujiformia
- Family: Cerambycidae
- Genus: Cleptometopus
- Species: C. simillimus

Binomial name
- Cleptometopus simillimus Breuning, 1947

Species of beetle

Cleptometopus simillimus is a species of beetle in the family Cerambycidae. It was discovered and described by Stephan von Breuning, an Austrian entomologist, in 1947. No subspecies of the beetle are listed in the Catalogue of Life. The species is predominantly found in Eurasia. A specimen of the beetle is displayed in the National Museum of Natural History in Washington, D.C., following its collection in Malaysia.
