= Serixia simplex =

Scientific classification
- Domain: Eukaryota
- Kingdom: Animalia
- Phylum: Arthropoda
- Class: Insecta
- Order: Coleoptera
- Suborder: Polyphaga
- Infraorder: Cucujiformia
- Family: Cerambycidae
- Genus: Serixia
- Species: S. simplex

Binomial name
- Serixia simplex (Aurivillius, 1927)

Species of beetle

Serixia simplex is a species of beetle in the family Cerambycidae. It was described by Per Olof Christopher Aurivillius in 1927.
