= Cleptometopus bimaculatus =

Scientific classification
- Kingdom: Animalia
- Phylum: Arthropoda
- Class: Insecta
- Order: Coleoptera
- Suborder: Polyphaga
- Infraorder: Cucujiformia
- Family: Cerambycidae
- Genus: Cleptometopus
- Species: C. bimaculatus

Binomial name
- Cleptometopus bimaculatus (Bates, 1873)

Species of beetle

Cleptometopus bimaculatus is a species of beetle in the family Cerambycidae. It was described by Henry Walter Bates in 1873.
