= Cleptometopus ochreomaculatus =

Scientific classification
- Kingdom: Animalia
- Phylum: Arthropoda
- Class: Insecta
- Order: Coleoptera
- Suborder: Polyphaga
- Infraorder: Cucujiformia
- Family: Cerambycidae
- Genus: Cleptometopus
- Species: C. ochreomaculatus

Binomial name
- Cleptometopus ochreomaculatus Breuning, 1982

Species of beetle

Cleptometopus ochreomaculatus is a species of beetle in the family Cerambycidae.

Cleptometopus ochreomaculatus was described by Breuning in 1982.
