= Serixia nilghirica =

Scientific classification
- Kingdom: Animalia
- Phylum: Arthropoda
- Class: Insecta
- Order: Coleoptera
- Suborder: Polyphaga
- Infraorder: Cucujiformia
- Family: Cerambycidae
- Subfamily: Lamiinae
- Tribe: Saperdini
- Genus: Serixia
- Species: S. nilghirica

Binomial name
- Serixia nilghirica Breuning, 1963

Species of beetle

Serixia nilghirica is a species of beetle in the family Cerambycidae. It was described by Stephan von Breuning in 1963.
