= Serixia trigonocephala =

Scientific classification
- Domain: Eukaryota
- Kingdom: Animalia
- Phylum: Arthropoda
- Class: Insecta
- Order: Coleoptera
- Suborder: Polyphaga
- Infraorder: Cucujiformia
- Family: Cerambycidae
- Genus: Serixia
- Species: S. trigonocephala

Binomial name
- Serixia trigonocephala (Heller, 1915)

Synonyms
- Xyaste trigonocephala Heller, 1915

Species of beetle

Serixia trigonocephala is a species of beetle in the family Cerambycidae. It was described by Heller in 1915.
