= Serixia signaticornis =

Scientific classification
- Domain: Eukaryota
- Kingdom: Animalia
- Phylum: Arthropoda
- Class: Insecta
- Order: Coleoptera
- Suborder: Polyphaga
- Infraorder: Cucujiformia
- Family: Cerambycidae
- Subfamily: Lamiinae
- Tribe: Saperdini
- Genus: Serixia
- Species: S. signaticornis

Binomial name
- Serixia signaticornis Schwarzer, 1925

Species of beetle

Serixia signaticornis is a species of beetle in the family Cerambycidae. It was described by Bernhard Schwarzer in 1925.
