= Serixia albopleura =

Scientific classification
- Domain: Eukaryota
- Kingdom: Animalia
- Phylum: Arthropoda
- Class: Insecta
- Order: Coleoptera
- Suborder: Polyphaga
- Infraorder: Cucujiformia
- Family: Cerambycidae
- Subfamily: Lamiinae
- Tribe: Saperdini
- Genus: Serixia
- Species: S. albopleura

Binomial name
- Serixia albopleura Gressitt, 1935

Species of beetle

Serixia albopleura is a species of beetle in the family Cerambycidae. It was described by Gressitt in 1935.
