= Cleptometopus tenellus =

Scientific classification
- Kingdom: Animalia
- Phylum: Arthropoda
- Class: Insecta
- Order: Coleoptera
- Suborder: Polyphaga
- Infraorder: Cucujiformia
- Family: Cerambycidae
- Genus: Cleptometopus
- Species: C. tenellus

Binomial name
- Cleptometopus tenellus (Pascoe, 1866)

Species of beetle

Cleptometopus tenellus is a species of beetle in the family Cerambycidae. It was described by Pascoe in 1866.
