= Cleptometopus filifer =

Scientific classification
- Kingdom: Animalia
- Phylum: Arthropoda
- Class: Insecta
- Order: Coleoptera
- Suborder: Polyphaga
- Infraorder: Cucujiformia
- Family: Cerambycidae
- Genus: Cleptometopus
- Species: C. filifer

Binomial name
- Cleptometopus filifer (Pascoe, 1866)

Species of beetle

Cleptometopus filifer is a species of beetle in the family Cerambycidae. It was described by Francis Polkinghorne Pascoe in 1866.
