= Cleptometopus trilineatus =

Scientific classification
- Kingdom: Animalia
- Phylum: Arthropoda
- Class: Insecta
- Order: Coleoptera
- Suborder: Polyphaga
- Infraorder: Cucujiformia
- Family: Cerambycidae
- Genus: Cleptometopus
- Species: C. trilineatus

Binomial name
- Cleptometopus trilineatus (Pic, 1924)

Species of beetle

Cleptometopus trilineatus is a species of beetle in the family Cerambycidae. It was described by Maurice Pic in 1924.
