= Serixia modesta =

Scientific classification
- Kingdom: Animalia
- Phylum: Arthropoda
- Clade: Pancrustacea
- Class: Insecta
- Order: Coleoptera
- Suborder: Polyphaga
- Infraorder: Cucujiformia
- Family: Cerambycidae
- Subfamily: Lamiinae
- Tribe: Saperdini
- Genus: Serixia
- Species: S. modesta

Binomial name
- Serixia modesta Pascoe, 1856

Synonyms
- Serixia rufodiscalis Breuning, 1958; Serixia rufina Breuning, 1958

Species of beetle

Serixia modesta is a species of beetle in the family Cerambycidae. It was described by Francis Polkinghorne Pascoe in 1856. It is known from Borneo.
