= Cleptometopus cephalotes =

Scientific classification
- Kingdom: Animalia
- Phylum: Arthropoda
- Class: Insecta
- Order: Coleoptera
- Suborder: Polyphaga
- Infraorder: Cucujiformia
- Family: Cerambycidae
- Genus: Cleptometopus
- Species: C. cephalotes

Binomial name
- Cleptometopus cephalotes (Pic, 1926)

Species of beetle

Cleptometopus cephalotes is a species of beetle in the family Cerambycidae. It was described by Maurice Pic in 1926.
