= Serixia apicalis =

Scientific classification
- Kingdom: Animalia
- Phylum: Arthropoda
- Class: Insecta
- Order: Coleoptera
- Suborder: Polyphaga
- Infraorder: Cucujiformia
- Family: Cerambycidae
- Subfamily: Lamiinae
- Tribe: Saperdini
- Genus: Serixia
- Species: S. apicalis

Binomial name
- Serixia apicalis Pascoe, 1857

Synonyms
- Serixia lychnura Pascoe, 1867

Species of beetle

Serixia apicalis is a species of beetle in the family Cerambycidae. It was described by Francis Polkinghorne Pascoe in 1856. It is known from Borneo and Malaysia.
