= Serixia phaeoptera =

Scientific classification
- Domain: Eukaryota
- Kingdom: Animalia
- Phylum: Arthropoda
- Class: Insecta
- Order: Coleoptera
- Suborder: Polyphaga
- Infraorder: Cucujiformia
- Family: Cerambycidae
- Subfamily: Lamiinae
- Tribe: Saperdini
- Genus: Serixia
- Species: S. phaeoptera

Binomial name
- Serixia phaeoptera Aurivillius, 1927

Species of beetle

Serixia phaeoptera is a species of beetle in the family Cerambycidae. It was described by Per Olof Christopher Aurivillius in 1927.

== Subspecies ==
- Serixia phaeoptera phaeoptera Aurivillius, 1927
- Serixia phaeoptera giloloensis Breuning, 1958
