= Serixia invida =

Scientific classification
- Kingdom: Animalia
- Phylum: Arthropoda
- Class: Insecta
- Order: Coleoptera
- Suborder: Polyphaga
- Infraorder: Cucujiformia
- Family: Cerambycidae
- Genus: Serixia
- Species: S. invida

Binomial name
- Serixia invida (Pascoe, 1867)

Synonyms
- Xyaste invida Pascoe, 1867

Species of beetle

Serixia invida is a species of beetle in the family Cerambycidae. It was described by Francis Polkinghorne Pascoe in 1867. It is known from Borneo.
