= Serixia ranauensis =

Scientific classification
- Kingdom: Animalia
- Phylum: Arthropoda
- Class: Insecta
- Order: Coleoptera
- Suborder: Polyphaga
- Infraorder: Cucujiformia
- Family: Cerambycidae
- Subfamily: Lamiinae
- Tribe: Saperdini
- Genus: Serixia
- Species: S. ranauensis

Binomial name
- Serixia ranauensis Hayashi, 1975

Species of beetle

Serixia ranauensis is a species of beetle in the family Cerambycidae. It was described by Masao Hayashi in 1975. It is known from Borneo.
