= Serixia rondoni =

Scientific classification
- Kingdom: Animalia
- Phylum: Arthropoda
- Class: Insecta
- Order: Coleoptera
- Suborder: Polyphaga
- Infraorder: Cucujiformia
- Family: Cerambycidae
- Subfamily: Lamiinae
- Tribe: Saperdini
- Genus: Serixia
- Species: S. rondoni

Binomial name
- Serixia rondoni Breuning, 1962

Species of beetle

Serixia rondoni is a species of beetle in the family Cerambycidae. It was described by Stephan von Breuning in 1962.
