= Serixia truncata =

Scientific classification
- Kingdom: Animalia
- Phylum: Arthropoda
- Class: Insecta
- Order: Coleoptera
- Suborder: Polyphaga
- Infraorder: Cucujiformia
- Family: Cerambycidae
- Subfamily: Lamiinae
- Tribe: Saperdini
- Genus: Serixia
- Species: S. truncata

Binomial name
- Serixia truncata Breuning, 1958

Species of beetle

Serixia truncata is a species of beetle in the family Cerambycidae. It was described by Stephan von Breuning in 1958.
