= Serixia prolata =

Scientific classification
- Domain: Eukaryota
- Kingdom: Animalia
- Phylum: Arthropoda
- Class: Insecta
- Order: Coleoptera
- Suborder: Polyphaga
- Infraorder: Cucujiformia
- Family: Cerambycidae
- Genus: Serixia
- Species: S. prolata

Binomial name
- Serixia prolata (Pascoe, 1858)

Synonyms
- Iole prolata Pascoe, 1858

Species of beetle

Serixia prolata is a species of beetle in the family Cerambycidae. It was described by Francis Polkinghorne Pascoe in 1858.

== Subspecies ==
- Serixia prolata prolata (Pascoe, 1858)
- Serixia prolata insularis Breuning, 1958
