= Serixia semiusta =

Scientific classification
- Domain: Eukaryota
- Kingdom: Animalia
- Phylum: Arthropoda
- Class: Insecta
- Order: Coleoptera
- Suborder: Polyphaga
- Infraorder: Cucujiformia
- Family: Cerambycidae
- Genus: Serixia
- Species: S. semiusta

Binomial name
- Serixia semiusta (Pascoe, 1867)

Synonyms
- Xyaste semiusta Pascoe, 1867

Species of beetle

Serixia semiusta is a species of beetle in the family Cerambycidae. It was first described by Francis Polkinghorne Pascoe in 1867, and is known to be from the Indonesian island of Sumatra.
