= Serixia cinereotomentosa =

Scientific classification
- Kingdom: Animalia
- Phylum: Arthropoda
- Class: Insecta
- Order: Coleoptera
- Suborder: Polyphaga
- Infraorder: Cucujiformia
- Family: Cerambycidae
- Subfamily: Lamiinae
- Tribe: Saperdini
- Genus: Serixia
- Species: S. cinereotomentosa

Binomial name
- Serixia cinereotomentosa Breuning, 1958

Species of beetle

Serixia cinereotomentosa is a species of beetle in the family Cerambycidae. It was described by Stephan von Breuning in 1958.
