= Serixia atra =

Scientific classification
- Domain: Eukaryota
- Kingdom: Animalia
- Phylum: Arthropoda
- Class: Insecta
- Order: Coleoptera
- Suborder: Polyphaga
- Infraorder: Cucujiformia
- Family: Cerambycidae
- Subfamily: Lamiinae
- Tribe: Saperdini
- Genus: Serixia
- Species: S. sinica

Binomial name
- Serixia sinica Gressitt, 1937

Species of beetle

Serixia atra is a species of beetle in the family Cerambycidae. It was described by Maurice Pic in 1936.
