= Cleptometopus =

Scientific classification
- Kingdom: Animalia
- Phylum: Arthropoda
- Class: Insecta
- Order: Coleoptera
- Suborder: Polyphaga
- Infraorder: Cucujiformia
- Family: Cerambycidae
- Tribe: Agapanthiini
- Genus: Cleptometopus; Thomson, 1864

Type species
- Cleptometopus terrestris Thomson, 1864

Genus of beetles

Cleptometopus is a genus of beetles in the family Cerambycidae, containing the following species:

- Cleptometopus angustrifrons Breuning, 1940
- Cleptometopus annulaticornis Matsushita, 1944
- Cleptometopus armatus (Jordan, 1894)
- Cleptometopus assamanus Breuning, 1967
- Cleptometopus auratoides Breuning & Itzinger, 1943
- Cleptometopus aureovittatus Breuning, 1947
- Cleptometopus basifossulatus Breuning, 1940
- Cleptometopus bhutanensis Breuning, 1975
- Cleptometopus biapicatus Breuning, 1942
- Cleptometopus bimaculatus (Bates, 1873)
- Cleptometopus cameroni Breuning, 1972
- Cleptometopus camuripes (Newman, 1842)
- Cleptometopus celebensis Breuning, 1942
- Cleptometopus cephalotes (Pic, 1926)
- Cleptometopus enganensis Gahan, 1907
- Cleptometopus filifer (Pascoe, 1866)
- Cleptometopus fisheri Gardner, 1941
- Cleptometopus flavolineatus Breuning, 1961
- Cleptometopus fuscosignatus Breuning, 1947
- Cleptometopus grandis Jordan, 1894
- Cleptometopus grossepunctatus Breuning, 1940
- Cleptometopus humeralis Gahan, 1907
- Cleptometopus indistinctus Breuning, 1940
- Cleptometopus invitticollis Breuning, 1958
- Cleptometopus javanicus Breuning, 1943
- Cleptometopus lepturoides Breuning, 1940
- Cleptometopus lobatus Breuning, 1940
- Cleptometopus luteonotatus (Pic, 1925)
- Cleptometopus malaisei Breuning, 1949
- Cleptometopus mimolivaceus Breuning, 1972
- Cleptometopus mindanaonis Breuning, 1940
- Cleptometopus mniszechii (Lacordaire, 1872)
- Cleptometopus montanus (Pascoe, 1866)
- Cleptometopus mussardi Breuning, 1977
- Cleptometopus niasensis Breuning, 1943
- Cleptometopus niasicus Aurivillius, 1926
- Cleptometopus ochreomaculatus Breuning, 1982
- Cleptometopus ochreoscutellaris Breuning, 1943
- Cleptometopus olivaceus Breuning, 1942
- Cleptometopus padangensis Breuning, 1943
- Cleptometopus papuanus Breuning, 1943
- Cleptometopus parolivaceus Breuning, 1966
- Cleptometopus perakensis Breuning, 1940
- Cleptometopus pseudolivaceus Breuning, 1975
- Cleptometopus pseudotenellus Breuning, 1950
- Cleptometopus quadrilineatus (Pic, 1924)
- Cleptometopus schmidi Breuning, 1971
- Cleptometopus scutellatus Hüdepohl, 1996
- Cleptometopus sericeus Gahan, 1895
- Cleptometopus sikkimensis Breuning, 1971
- Cleptometopus similis Gahan, 1895
- Cleptometopus simillimus Breuning, 1947
- Cleptometopus strandi Breuning, 1942
- Cleptometopus striatopunctatus Breuning, 1940
- Cleptometopus subolivaceus Breuning, 1949
- Cleptometopus subteraureus Breuning, 1967
- Cleptometopus subundulatus Breuning, 1966
- Cleptometopus sumatranus Breuning, 1942
- Cleptometopus tenellus (Pascoe, 1866)
- Cleptometopus terrestris J. Thomson, 1864
- Cleptometopus trilineatus (Pic, 1924)
- Cleptometopus undulatus (Pic, 1934)
- Cleptometopus unicolor Breuning, 1940
