= Serixia woodlarkiana =

Scientific classification
- Kingdom: Animalia
- Phylum: Arthropoda
- Class: Insecta
- Order: Coleoptera
- Suborder: Polyphaga
- Infraorder: Cucujiformia
- Family: Cerambycidae
- Subfamily: Lamiinae
- Tribe: Saperdini
- Genus: Serixia
- Species: S. woodlarkiana

Binomial name
- Serixia woodlarkiana Breuning, 1958

Species of beetle

Serixia woodlarkiana is a species of beetle in the family Cerambycidae. It was described by Stephan von Breuning in 1958. It is known from Papua New Guinea.
