= Cleptometopus niasicus =

Scientific classification
- Kingdom: Animalia
- Phylum: Arthropoda
- Class: Insecta
- Order: Coleoptera
- Suborder: Polyphaga
- Infraorder: Cucujiformia
- Family: Cerambycidae
- Genus: Cleptometopus
- Species: C. niasicus

Binomial name
- Cleptometopus niasicus Aurivillius, 1926

Species of beetle

Cleptometopus niasicus is a species of beetle in the family Cerambycidae. It was described by Per Olof Christopher Aurivillius in 1926.
