= Serixia formosana =

Scientific classification
- Kingdom: Animalia
- Phylum: Arthropoda
- Class: Insecta
- Order: Coleoptera
- Suborder: Polyphaga
- Infraorder: Cucujiformia
- Family: Cerambycidae
- Subfamily: Lamiinae
- Tribe: Saperdini
- Genus: Serixia
- Species: S. formosana

Binomial name
- Serixia formosana Breuning, 1960

Species of beetle

Serixia formosana is a species of beetle in the family Cerambycidae. It was described by Stephan von Breuning in 1960. It is endemic to Taiwan.

It measures about 8 mm (0.31 in) in length.
