= Cleptometopus luteonotatus =

Scientific classification
- Kingdom: Animalia
- Phylum: Arthropoda
- Class: Insecta
- Order: Coleoptera
- Suborder: Polyphaga
- Infraorder: Cucujiformia
- Family: Cerambycidae
- Genus: Cleptometopus
- Species: C. luteonotatus

Binomial name
- Cleptometopus luteonotatus (Pic, 1925)

Species of beetle

Cleptometopus luteonotatus is a species of beetle in the family Cerambycidae. It was described by Maurice Pic in 1925.
