= Serixia fumosa =

Scientific classification
- Kingdom: Animalia
- Phylum: Arthropoda
- Clade: Pancrustacea
- Class: Insecta
- Order: Coleoptera
- Suborder: Polyphaga
- Infraorder: Cucujiformia
- Family: Cerambycidae
- Subfamily: Lamiinae
- Tribe: Saperdini
- Genus: Serixia
- Species: S. fumosa

Binomial name
- Serixia fumosa (Pascoe, 1867)

Synonyms
- Xyaste fumosa Pascoe, 1867; Serixia peraffinis Breuning, 1958

Species of beetle

Serixia fumosa is a species of beetle in the family Cerambycidae. It was described by Francis Polkinghorne Pascoe in 1867. It is known from Sumatra and Borneo.
