= Serixia literata =

Scientific classification
- Kingdom: Animalia
- Phylum: Arthropoda
- Clade: Pancrustacea
- Class: Insecta
- Order: Coleoptera
- Suborder: Polyphaga
- Infraorder: Cucujiformia
- Family: Cerambycidae
- Genus: Serixia
- Species: S. literata

Binomial name
- Serixia literata (Pascoe, 1858)

Synonyms
- Serixia reductesignata Breuning, 1958; Iole literata Pascoe, 1858

Species of beetle

Serixia literata is a species of beetle in the family Cerambycidae. It was described by Francis Polkinghorne Pascoe in 1858. It is known from Malaysia, Borneo and Sulawesi.
