= Cleptometopus auratoides =

Scientific classification
- Kingdom: Animalia
- Phylum: Arthropoda
- Class: Insecta
- Order: Coleoptera
- Suborder: Polyphaga
- Infraorder: Cucujiformia
- Family: Cerambycidae
- Genus: Cleptometopus
- Species: C. auratoides

Binomial name
- Cleptometopus auratoides Breuning & Itzinger, 1943

Species of beetle

Cleptometopus auratoides is a species of beetle in the family Cerambycidae. It was described by Stephan von Breuning and Itzinger in 1943.
