= Cleptometopus annulaticornis =

Scientific classification
- Kingdom: Animalia
- Phylum: Arthropoda
- Class: Insecta
- Order: Coleoptera
- Suborder: Polyphaga
- Infraorder: Cucujiformia
- Family: Cerambycidae
- Genus: Cleptometopus
- Species: C. annulaticornis

Binomial name
- Cleptometopus annulaticornis Matsushita, 1944

Species of beetle

Cleptometopus annulaticornis is a species of beetle in the family Cerambycidae. It was described by Matsushita in 1944.
