= James Clark Molesworth Gardner =

British entomologist

James Clark Molesworth Gardner CIE (15 March 1894 – 7 March 1970) was a British entomologist who worked on the systematics of insects, particularly forest insects, while employed in the Indian Forest Service at the Forest Research Institute, Dehra Dun in India.

Gardner was a fellow of the Royal Entomological Society of London from 1920. Gardner studied entomology under Harold Maxwell Lefroy. He worked as a systematic entomologist at the Forest Research Institute in Dehra Dun, recruited along with Malcolm Cameron by C.F.C. Beeson. He worked briefly in Bengal before moving to Dehra Dun in 1923 after Cameron moved back to England. He specialized on wood damaging beetle larvae (especially from families such as Anthribidae, Platypodidae, Bostrichidae, Scolytidae, Eucnemidae, Cleridae and Cerambycidae) but also worked on taxonomic aspects of beetles based on larval characters. He published a series of articles on the "Immature stages of Indian Coleoptera" and also worked on Lepidoptera, particularly moths of the family Noctuidae (now known as the Erebidae). He headed the systematic entomology division at the FRI from 1941 to 1947 and was created companion of Order of the Indian Empire in 1945.

== Publications ==
Some of the writings of Gardner include:

- Gardner, J.C.M. (1934). "Immature stages of Indian Coleoptera (Scolytidae)". Indian Forest Records. 20 (8): 1–17.
- ————— (1938). "Immature stages of Indian Lepidoptera -(I) Lymantridae". Indian Forest Records. 3 (1): 187–217.
- ————— (1941). "Immature stages of Indian Lepidoptera-(2) Noctuidae, Hypsidae". Indian Forest Records. 6 (8): 253–296.
- ————— (1941). "Immature stages of Indian Lepidoptera-(3)". Indian Forest Records. 6 (9): 299–314.
- ————— (1942). "Immature stages of Indian Lepidoptera-(4) Zygaenidae". 7 (4): 155–162.
- ————— (1945). "Immature stage of Indian Lepidoptera-(5)". Indian J. Entomol. 5: 89–102.
- ————— (1946). "On larvae of the Noctuidae (Lepidoptera) - I.". Transactions of the Royal Entomological Society of London. 96 (4): 61–72. doi:10.1111/j.1365-2311.1946.tb00443.x.
- ————— (1946). "On larvae of the Noctuidae (Lepidoptera) - II". Transactions of the Royal Entomological Society of London. 97 (10): 237–252. doi:10.1111/j.1365-2311.1946.tb00265.x.
- ————— (1947). "On larvae of the Noctuidae (Lepidoptera) - III". Transactions of the Royal Entomological Society of London. 98: 59–89. doi:10.1111/j.1365-2311.1947.tb01052.x.
- ————— (1948). "On larvae of the Noctuidae (Lepidoptera) IV". Transactions of the Royal Entomological Society of London. 99 (8): 291–318. doi:10.1111/j.1365-2311.1948.tb01239.x.
