= Nupserha vanrooni =

Scientific classification
- Domain: Eukaryota
- Kingdom: Animalia
- Phylum: Arthropoda
- Class: Insecta
- Order: Coleoptera
- Suborder: Polyphaga
- Infraorder: Cucujiformia
- Family: Cerambycidae
- Genus: Nupserha
- Species: N. vanrooni

Binomial name
- Nupserha vanrooni (Aurivillius, 1916)

Synonyms
- Synnupserha van-rooni Aurivillius, 1916

Species of beetle

Nupserha vanrooni is a species of beetle in the family Cerambycidae. It was described by Per Olof Christopher Aurivillius in 1916. It is known from Tanzania and Malawi.

== Varietas ==
- Nupserha vanrooni var. fuscomaculata Breuning, 1958
- Nupserha vanrooni var. holoflavipennis Breuning, 1958
- Nupserha vanrooni var. medionigripennis Breuning, 1958
- Nupserha vanrooni var. quadrisignata Breuning, 1958
- Nupserha vanrooni var. sexsignata Breuning, 1958
- Nupserha vanrooni var. usambarica Breuning, 1958
