= Nupserha ceylonica =

Scientific classification
- Domain: Eukaryota
- Kingdom: Animalia
- Phylum: Arthropoda
- Class: Insecta
- Order: Coleoptera
- Suborder: Polyphaga
- Infraorder: Cucujiformia
- Family: Cerambycidae
- Genus: Nupserha
- Species: N. ceylonica

Binomial name
- Nupserha ceylonica Gardner, 1936

Species of beetle

Nupserha ceylonica is a species of beetle in the family Cerambycidae. It was described by James Clark Molesworth Gardner in 1936.
