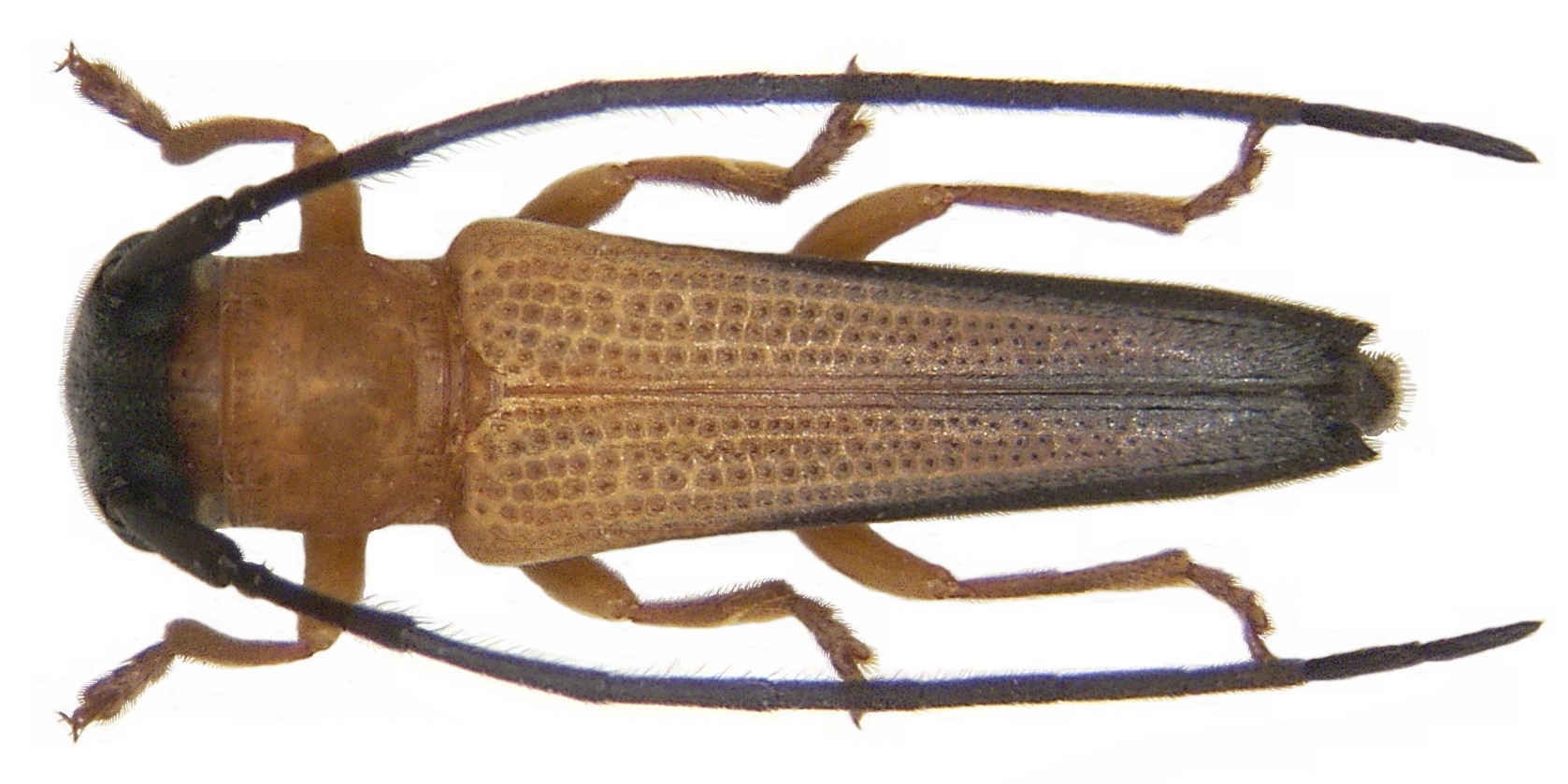
- Nupserha fricator

Scientific classification
- Domain: Eukaryota
- Kingdom: Animalia
- Phylum: Arthropoda
- Class: Insecta
- Order: Coleoptera
- Suborder: Polyphaga
- Infraorder: Cucujiformia
- Family: Cerambycidae
- Tribe: Saperdini
- Genus: Nupserha; Chevrolat, 1858

Type species
- Stibara cosmopolita Thomson, 1857.

= Nupserha =

Genus of beetles

Nupserha is a genus of longhorn beetles of the subfamily Lamiinae, containing the following species:

- Nupserha acuta Holzschuh, 1986
- Nupserha alexandrovi Plavilstshikov, 1915
- Nupserha andamanica Breuning, 1960
- Nupserha annamana Breuning, 1960
- Nupserha annulata (Thomson, 1857)
- Nupserha antennalis Jordan, 1894
- Nupserha antennata Gahan, 1894
- Nupserha antinorii Aurivillius, 1926
- Nupserha apicata Fairmaire, 1891
- Nupserha assamana Breuning, 1960
- Nupserha aterrima Breuning, 1967
- Nupserha atriceps Breuning, 1948
- Nupserha aurodiscalis Breuning, 1953
- Nupserha basalis (Erichson, 1843)
- Nupserha basipilosa Holzschuh, 1986
- Nupserha bicolor (Thomson, 1857)
- Nupserha bicoloripennis Breuning, 1958
- Nupserha bidentata (Fabricius, 1792)
- Nupserha bipunctata (Aurivillius, 1914)
- Nupserha bivittata Aurivillius, 1907
- Nupserha brachytrita Aurivillius, 1914
- Nupserha brevior (Pic, 1908)
- Nupserha carinicollis (Hintz, 1919)
- Nupserha cauta Holzschuh, 1986
- Nupserha cerrutii Breuning, 1953
- Nupserha ceylonica Gardner, 1936
- Nupserha clypealis (Fairmaire, 1895)
- Nupserha conradti Kolbe, 1894
- Nupserha convergens (Aurivillius, 1914)
- Nupserha curialis Pascoe, 1866
- Nupserha deusta (Dalman, 1817)
- Nupserha elongata (Kolbe, 1893)
- Nupserha elongatissima Breuning, 1950
- Nupserha endroedyi Breuning, 1981
- Nupserha fasciata Aurivillius, 1907
- Nupserha flavipennis Breuning, 1950
- Nupserha flavipes Breuning, 1951
- Nupserha flavitarsis Breuning, 1960
- Nupserha flavoapicalis Breuning, 1950
- Nupserha flavonotum (Aurivillius, 1915)
- Nupserha fricator (Dalman, 1817)
- Nupserha fumata (Heyden, 1897)
- Nupserha fuscoapicalis Breuning, 1949
- Nupserha gahani Gestro, 1895
- Nupserha gestroi Breuning, 1950
- Nupserha grisea (Aurivillius, 1914)
- Nupserha hintzi Aurivillius, 1923
- Nupserha homeyeri Harold, 1879
- Nupserha infantula (Ganglbauer, 1889)
- Nupserha infuscata Breuning, 1960
- Nupserha insignis Aurivillius, 1911
- Nupserha kenyensis Breuning, 1958
- Nupserha laterifuga (Chevrolat, 1855)
- Nupserha laticollis Breuning, 1960
- Nupserha lenita (Pascoe, 1867)
- Nupserha longipennis Pic, 1926
- Nupserha madurensis Pic, 1926
- Nupserha malabarensis Pic, 1939
- Nupserha malaisei Breuning, 1949
- Nupserha marginella (Bates, 1873)
- Nupserha mediofusciventris Breuning, 1962
- Nupserha melanoscelis Aurivillius, 1922
- Nupserha minor Pic, 1939
- Nupserha monticola (Hintz, 1919)
- Nupserha mozambica Breuning, 1958
- Nupserha multimaculata Pic, 1939
- Nupserha mutata Pascoe, 1867
- Nupserha nigerrima Hintz, 1919
- Nupserha nigriceps Gahan, 1894
- Nupserha nigricollis Breuning, 1960
- Nupserha nigricornis Fisher, 1935
- Nupserha nigrohumeralis Pic, 1927
- Nupserha nigrolateralis Breuning, 1955
- Nupserha nitidior Pic, 1939
- Nupserha nyassensis Aurivillius, 1914
- Nupserha ornaticollis Breuning, 1949
- Nupserha oxyura (Pascoe, 1867)
- Nupserha pallescens Aurivillius, 1913
- Nupserha pallidipennis (Redtenbacher, 1858)
- Nupserha parakenyensis Breuning, 1978
- Nupserha pararufipennis Breuning, 1978
- Nupserha perforata Breuning, 1958
- Nupserha pseudinfantula Breuning, 1948
- Nupserha pseudoflavinotum Breunng, 1950
- Nupserha punctata Jordan, 1894
- Nupserha puncticollis Breuning, 1960
- Nupserha punctigera (Pascoe, 1867)
- Nupserha quadricostata (Hintz, 1911)
- Nupserha quadrioculata (Thunberg, 1787)
- Nupserha rhodesica Breuning, 1978
- Nupserha rotundicollis Breuning, 1950
- Nupserha rotundipennis Breuning, 1950
- Nupserha rufipennis Breuning, 1949
- Nupserha rufonotaticeps Breuning, 1960
- Nupserha rufulipennis Breuning, 1963
- Nupserha schmidi Breuning, 1966
- Nupserha sericea Breuning, 1955
- Nupserha sexpunctata (Chevrolat, 1857)
- Nupserha seychellarum Breuning, 1982
- Nupserha similis Breuning, 1978
- Nupserha somalica Breuning, 1951
- Nupserha spinifera Gressitt, 1948
- Nupserha subabbreviata (Pic, 1916)
- Nupserha sublenita Breuning, 1950
- Nupserha subternigra Breuning, 1960
- Nupserha szetschuanica Breuning, 1947
- Nupserha taliana (Pic, 1916)
- Nupserha tanganjicae Breuning, 1978
- Nupserha tatsienlui Breuning, 1948
- Nupserha tessmanni Breuning, 1958
- Nupserha testaceipes Pic, 1926
- Nupserha thibetana Breuning, 1948
- Nupserha tricolor Aurivillius, 1920
- Nupserha ugandensis Breuning, 1978
- Nupserha univitticollis Breuning, 1958
- Nupserha ustulata (Erichson, 1834)
- Nupserha vanrooni (Aurivillius, 1916)
- Nupserha variabilis Gahan, 1894
- Nupserha variicornis (Hintz, 1919)
- Nupserha ventralis Gahan, 1894
- Nupserha vexator (Pascoe, 1858)
- Nupserha vitticollis (Kolbe, 1893)
- Nupserha yunnana Breuning, 1960
- Nupserha yunnanensis Breuning, 1960
