= Nupserha perforata =

Scientific classification
- Kingdom: Animalia
- Phylum: Arthropoda
- Class: Insecta
- Order: Coleoptera
- Suborder: Polyphaga
- Infraorder: Cucujiformia
- Family: Cerambycidae
- Genus: Nupserha
- Species: N. perforata

Binomial name
- Nupserha perforata Breuning, 1958

Synonyms
- Nupserha perforata m. arussiana Téocchi, Sudre & Jiroux, 2008

Species of beetle

Nupserha perforata is a species of beetle in the family Cerambycidae. It was described by Stephan von Breuning in 1958. It is known from Ethiopia.
