= Nupserha pallescens =

Scientific classification
- Kingdom: Animalia
- Phylum: Arthropoda
- Class: Insecta
- Order: Coleoptera
- Suborder: Polyphaga
- Infraorder: Cucujiformia
- Family: Cerambycidae
- Genus: Nupserha
- Species: N. pallescens

Binomial name
- Nupserha pallescens Aurivillius, 1913

Synonyms
- Nupserha elongata Aurivillius, 1913 nec Kolbe, 1893

Species of beetle

Nupserha pallescens is a species of beetle in the family Cerambycidae. It was described by Per Olof Christopher Aurivillius in 1913. It is known from Borneo.
