= Nupserha vexator =

Scientific classification
- Domain: Eukaryota
- Kingdom: Animalia
- Phylum: Arthropoda
- Class: Insecta
- Order: Coleoptera
- Suborder: Polyphaga
- Infraorder: Cucujiformia
- Family: Cerambycidae
- Genus: Nupserha
- Species: N. vexator

Binomial name
- Nupserha vexator (Pascoe, 1858)

Synonyms
- Glenea vexator Pascoe, 1858

Species of beetle

Nupserha vexator is a species of beetle in the family Cerambycidae. It was described by Francis Polkinghorne Pascoe in 1858. It is known from Sri Lanka.
