= Nupserha brachytrita =

Scientific classification
- Domain: Eukaryota
- Kingdom: Animalia
- Phylum: Arthropoda
- Class: Insecta
- Order: Coleoptera
- Suborder: Polyphaga
- Infraorder: Cucujiformia
- Family: Cerambycidae
- Genus: Nupserha
- Species: N. brachytrita

Binomial name
- Nupserha brachytrita Aurivillius, 1914

Species of beetle

Nupserha brachytrita is a species of beetle in the family Cerambycidae. It was described by Per Olof Christopher Aurivillius in 1914.

== Varietas ==
- Nupserha brachytrita var. vitticeps Breuning, 1950
- Nupserha brachytrita var. fuscoreducta Breuning, 1953
