= Nupserha quadricostata =

Scientific classification
- Domain: Eukaryota
- Kingdom: Animalia
- Phylum: Arthropoda
- Class: Insecta
- Order: Coleoptera
- Suborder: Polyphaga
- Infraorder: Cucujiformia
- Family: Cerambycidae
- Genus: Nupserha
- Species: N. quadricostata

Binomial name
- Nupserha quadricostata (Hintz, 1911)

Synonyms
- Nupserha forticornis Breuning, 1950; Synnupserha quadricostata Hintz, 1911; Nupserha quadricostata m. ugandicola Breuning, 1960

Species of beetle

Nupserha quadricostata is a species of beetle in the family Cerambycidae. It was described by Hintz in 1911, originally under the genus Synnupserha. It is known from Uganda and the Democratic Republic of the Congo.
