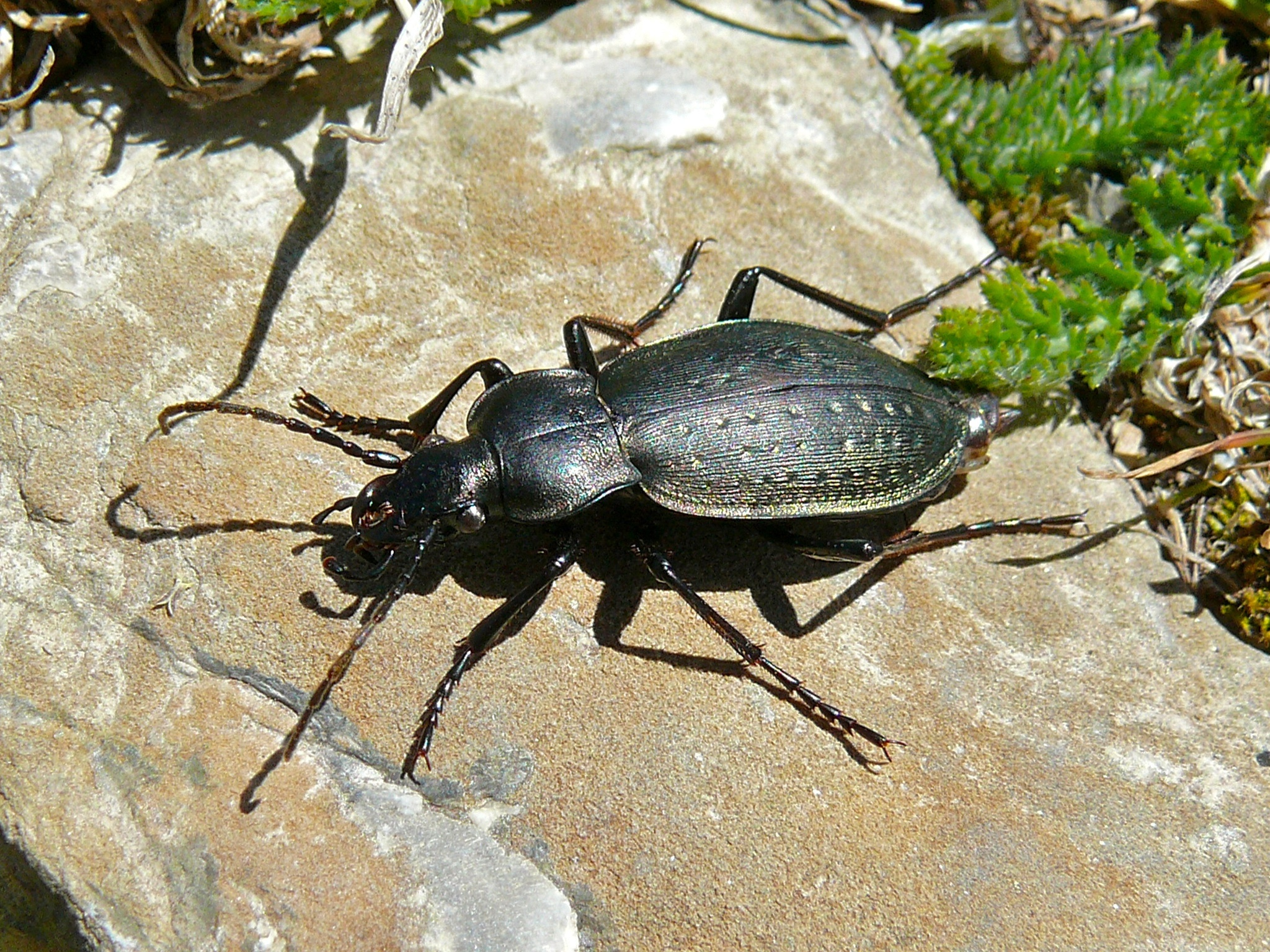
- C. pedemontanus omensis

Scientific classification
- Domain: Eukaryota
- Kingdom: Animalia
- Phylum: Arthropoda
- Class: Insecta
- Order: Coleoptera
- Suborder: Adephaga
- Family: Carabidae
- Genus: Carabus
- Species: C. pedemontanus

Binomial name
- Carabus pedemontanus Ganglbauer, 1892

= Carabus pedemontanus =

Species of beetle

Carabus pedemontanus is a species of beetle from family Carabidae, found in France and Italy.

Subspecies include:

- Carabus pedemontanus maurinensis
- Carabus pedemontanus omensis
- Carabus pedemontanus vesubianus
