= Nupserha bipunctata =

Scientific classification
- Domain: Eukaryota
- Kingdom: Animalia
- Phylum: Arthropoda
- Class: Insecta
- Order: Coleoptera
- Suborder: Polyphaga
- Infraorder: Cucujiformia
- Family: Cerambycidae
- Genus: Nupserha
- Species: N. bipunctata

Binomial name
- Nupserha bipunctata (Aurivillius, 1914)

Synonyms
- Synnupserha bipunctata Aurivillius, 1914

Species of beetle

Nupserha bipunctata is a species of beetle in the family Cerambycidae. It was described by Per Olof Christopher Aurivillius in 1914.

== Subspecies ==
- Nupserha bipunctata bipunctata (Aurivillius, 1914)
- Nupserha bipunctata hartwigi (Breuning, 1964)
