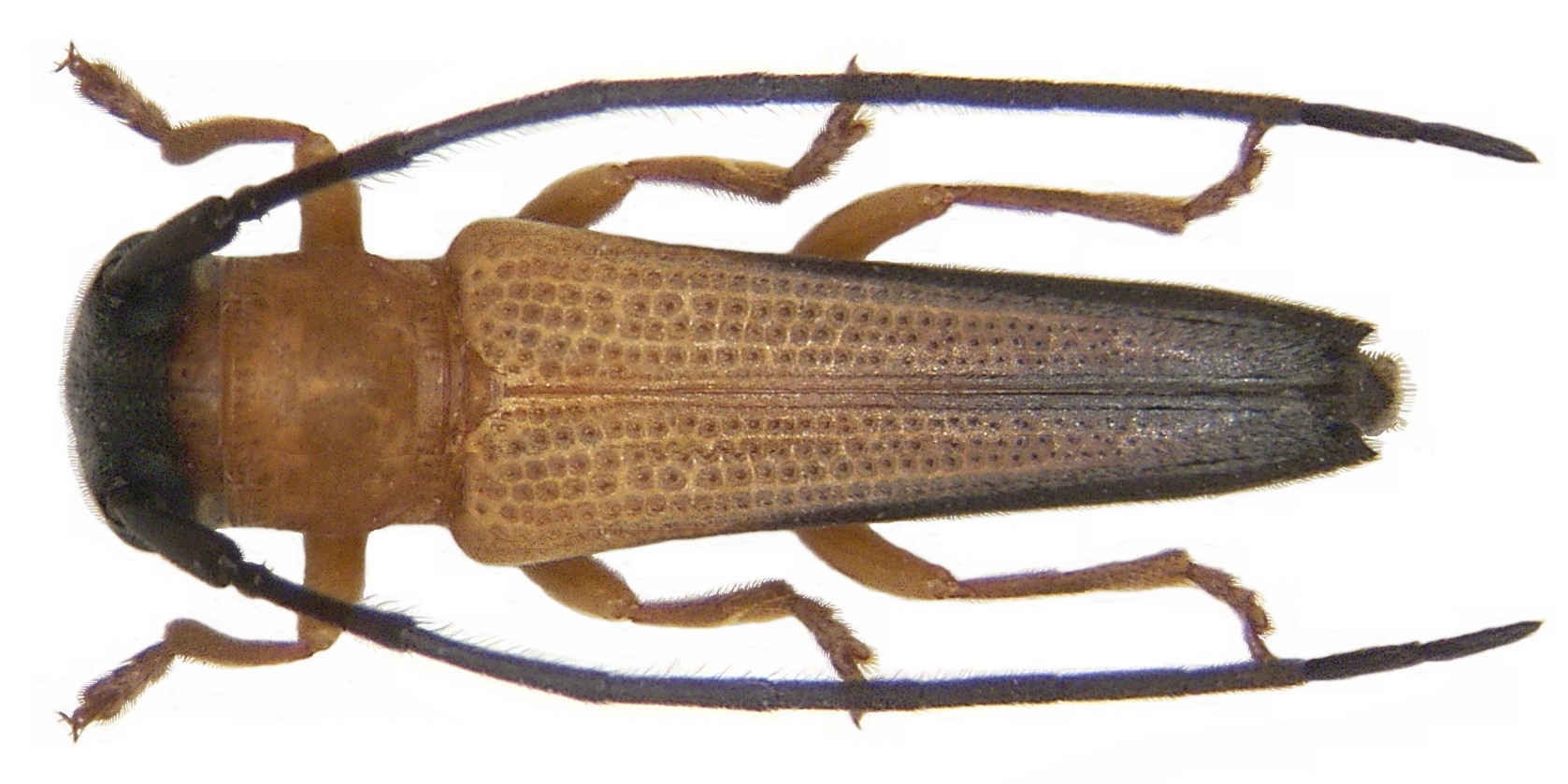
- Nupserha fricator celebiana

Scientific classification
- Kingdom: Animalia
- Phylum: Arthropoda
- Clade: Pancrustacea
- Class: Insecta
- Order: Coleoptera
- Suborder: Polyphaga
- Infraorder: Cucujiformia
- Family: Cerambycidae
- Genus: Nupserha
- Species: N. fricator

Binomial name
- Nupserha fricator (Dalman, 1817)

Synonyms
- Saperda fricator Dalman, 1817

= Nupserha fricator =

Species of beetle

Nupserha fricator is a species of beetle in the family Cerambycidae. It was described by Dalman in 1817. It is known from Java, Sulawesi, India, Myanmar, Philippines, Sumatra, Malaysia, and Thailand.

== Subspecies ==
- Nupserha fricator celebiana Breuning, 1950
- Nupserha fricator fricator (Dalman, 1817)
