= Nupserha oxyura =

Scientific classification
- Kingdom: Animalia
- Phylum: Arthropoda
- Clade: Pancrustacea
- Class: Insecta
- Order: Coleoptera
- Suborder: Polyphaga
- Infraorder: Cucujiformia
- Family: Cerambycidae
- Genus: Nupserha
- Species: N. oxyura

Binomial name
- Nupserha oxyura (Pascoe, 1867)

Synonyms
- Scytasis oxyura Pascoe, 1867; Nupserha sexmaculata Pic, 1928

Species of beetle

Nupserha oxyura is a species of beetle in the family Cerambycidae. It was described by Francis Polkinghorne Pascoe in 1867. It is known as a long horn from Sumatra and Borneo.

== Varietas ==
- Nupserha oxyura var. postflavipes Breuning, 1950
- Nupserha oxyura var. elongatoides Breuning, 1950
- Nupserha oxyura var. oxyuroides Breuning, 1950
