= Nupserha tanganjicae =

Scientific classification
- Kingdom: Animalia
- Phylum: Arthropoda
- Class: Insecta
- Order: Coleoptera
- Suborder: Polyphaga
- Infraorder: Cucujiformia
- Family: Cerambycidae
- Genus: Nupserha
- Species: N. tanganjicae

Binomial name
- Nupserha tanganjicae Breuning, 1978

Species of beetle

Nupserha tanganjicae is a species of beetle in the family Cerambycidae. It was described by Stephan von Breuning in 1978.

== Subspecies ==
- Nupserha tanganjicae uluguruensis Breuning, 1978
- Nupserha tanganjicae tanganjicae Breuning, 1978
