= Nupserha deusta =

Scientific classification
- Domain: Eukaryota
- Kingdom: Animalia
- Phylum: Arthropoda
- Class: Insecta
- Order: Coleoptera
- Suborder: Polyphaga
- Infraorder: Cucujiformia
- Family: Cerambycidae
- Genus: Nupserha
- Species: N. deusta

Binomial name
- Nupserha deusta (Dalman, 1817)

Species of beetle

Nupserha deusta is a species of beetle in the family Cerambycidae. It was described by Dalman in 1817.

== Subspecies ==
- Nupserha deusta deusta (Dalman, 1817)
- Nupserha deusta testacea Aurivillius, 1914
