= Nupserha bidentata =

Scientific classification
- Kingdom: Animalia
- Phylum: Arthropoda
- Class: Insecta
- Order: Coleoptera
- Suborder: Polyphaga
- Infraorder: Cucujiformia
- Family: Cerambycidae
- Genus: Nupserha
- Species: N. bidentata

Binomial name
- Nupserha bidentata (Fabricius, 1792)

Synonyms
- Saperda bidentata Fabricius, 1792; Nupserha bidentata m. maculatoides Breuning, 1976; Nupserha bidentata m. flavoabdominalis Breuning, 1976; Nupserha bidentula (Dalman) Jordan, 1894

Species of beetle

Nupserha bidentata is a species of beetle in the family Cerambycidae. It was described by Johan Christian Fabricius in 1792, originally under the genus Saperda.

== Varietas ==
- Nupserha bidentula var. apicipennis Breuning, 1956
- Nupserha bidentata var. nigropunctata Breuning, 1953
- Nupserha bidentata var. flavooculata Breuning, 1953
- Nupserha bidentata var. flavulipennis Breuning, 1958
- Nupserha bidentata var. ruficornis Breuning, 1950
- Nupserha bidentata var. immaculata Breuning, 1958
- Nupserha bidentata var. immaculifrons Breuning, 1949
- Nupserha bidentata var. inoculata Breuning, 1953
- Nupserha bidentata var. nigroabdominalis Breuning, 1950
- Nupserha bidentata var. flavicollis Breuning, 1950
- Nupserha bidentata var. nigroreductipennis Breuning, 1950
- Nupserha bidentata var. submaculata Breuning, 1949
- Nupserha bidentata var. holoruficornis Breuning, 1958
- Nupserha bidentula var. bancoensis Lepesme & Breuning, 1951
