= Nupserha spinifera =

Scientific classification
- Domain: Eukaryota
- Kingdom: Animalia
- Phylum: Arthropoda
- Class: Insecta
- Order: Coleoptera
- Suborder: Polyphaga
- Infraorder: Cucujiformia
- Family: Cerambycidae
- Genus: Nupserha
- Species: N. spinifera

Binomial name
- Nupserha spinifera Gressitt, 1948

Species of beetle

Nupserha spinifera is a species of beetle in the family Cerambycidae. It was described by Gressitt in 1948.

== Subspecies ==
- Nupserha spinifera spinifera Gressitt, 1948
- Nupserha spinifera sumatrana Breuning, 1960
