= Nupserha elongatissima =

Scientific classification
- Kingdom: Animalia
- Phylum: Arthropoda
- Class: Insecta
- Order: Coleoptera
- Suborder: Polyphaga
- Infraorder: Cucujiformia
- Family: Cerambycidae
- Genus: Nupserha
- Species: N. elongatissima

Binomial name
- Nupserha elongatissima Breuning, 1950

Species of beetle

Nupserha elongatissima is a species of beetle in the family Cerambycidae. It was described by Stephan von Breuning in 1950.

== Subspecies ==
- Nupserha elongatissima mirei Breuning, 1977
- Nupserha elongatissima elongatissima Breuning, 1950
