= Nupserha rotundicollis =

Scientific classification
- Kingdom: Animalia
- Phylum: Arthropoda
- Class: Insecta
- Order: Coleoptera
- Suborder: Polyphaga
- Infraorder: Cucujiformia
- Family: Cerambycidae
- Genus: Nupserha
- Species: N. rotundicollis

Binomial name
- Nupserha rotundicollis Breuning, 1950

Species of beetle

Nupserha rotundicollis is a species of beetle in the family Cerambycidae. It was described by Stephan von Breuning in 1950.
