= Nupserha fasciata =

Scientific classification
- Domain: Eukaryota
- Kingdom: Animalia
- Phylum: Arthropoda
- Class: Insecta
- Order: Coleoptera
- Suborder: Polyphaga
- Infraorder: Cucujiformia
- Family: Cerambycidae
- Genus: Nupserha
- Species: N. fasciata

Binomial name
- Nupserha fasciata Aurivillius, 1907

Species of beetle

Nupserha fasciata is a species of beetle in the family Cerambycidae. It was described by Per Olof Christopher Aurivillius in 1907.

== Subspecies ==
- Nupserha fasciata téocchii F. Vitali & C. Vitali, 2012
- Nupserha fasciata fasciata Aurivillius, 1907
