= Nupserha parakenyensis =

Scientific classification
- Kingdom: Animalia
- Phylum: Arthropoda
- Class: Insecta
- Order: Coleoptera
- Suborder: Polyphaga
- Infraorder: Cucujiformia
- Family: Cerambycidae
- Genus: Nupserha
- Species: N. parakenyensis

Binomial name
- Nupserha parakenyensis Breuning, 1978

Species of beetle

Nupserha parakenyensis is a species of beetle in the family Cerambycidae. It was described by Stephan von Breuning in 1978.
