= Nupserha melanoscelis =

Scientific classification
- Domain: Eukaryota
- Kingdom: Animalia
- Phylum: Arthropoda
- Class: Insecta
- Order: Coleoptera
- Suborder: Polyphaga
- Infraorder: Cucujiformia
- Family: Cerambycidae
- Genus: Nupserha
- Species: N. melanoscelis

Binomial name
- Nupserha melanoscelis Aurivillius, 1922

Species of beetle

Nupserha melanoscelis is a species of beetle in the family Cerambycidae. It was described by Per Olof Christopher Aurivillius in 1922.
