= Nupserha ventralis =

Scientific classification
- Domain: Eukaryota
- Kingdom: Animalia
- Phylum: Arthropoda
- Class: Insecta
- Order: Coleoptera
- Suborder: Polyphaga
- Infraorder: Cucujiformia
- Family: Cerambycidae
- Genus: Nupserha
- Species: N. ventralis

Binomial name
- Nupserha ventralis Gahan, 1894

Species of beetle

Nupserha ventralis is a species of beetle in the family Cerambycidae. It was described by Charles Joseph Gahan in 1894.
