= Nupserha ugandensis =

Scientific classification
- Kingdom: Animalia
- Phylum: Arthropoda
- Class: Insecta
- Order: Coleoptera
- Suborder: Polyphaga
- Infraorder: Cucujiformia
- Family: Cerambycidae
- Genus: Nupserha
- Species: N. ugandensis

Binomial name
- Nupserha ugandensis Breuning, 1978

Synonyms
- Nupserha ugandensis m. nigrolateralis Breuning, 1978

Species of beetle

Nupserha ugandensis is a species of beetle in the family Cerambycidae. It was described by Stephan von Breuning in 1978. It is known from Uganda.
