= Nupserha nigricornis =

Scientific classification
- Kingdom: Animalia
- Phylum: Arthropoda
- Class: Insecta
- Order: Coleoptera
- Suborder: Polyphaga
- Infraorder: Cucujiformia
- Family: Cerambycidae
- Genus: Nupserha
- Species: N. nigricornis

Binomial name
- Nupserha nigricornis Fisher, 1935

Synonyms
- Nupserha ustulata var. nigricornis Fisher, 1935

Species of beetle

Nupserha nigricornis is a species of beetle in the family Cerambycidae. It was described by Warren Samuel Fisher in 1935. It is known from Borneo.
