= Nupserha rufulipennis =

Scientific classification
- Kingdom: Animalia
- Phylum: Arthropoda
- Class: Insecta
- Order: Coleoptera
- Suborder: Polyphaga
- Infraorder: Cucujiformia
- Family: Cerambycidae
- Genus: Nupserha
- Species: N. rufulipennis

Binomial name
- Nupserha rufulipennis Breuning, 1963

Species of beetle

Nupserha rufulipennis is a species of beetle in the family Cerambycidae. It was described by Stephan von Breuning in 1963.

Its type locality is the Rwenzori Mountains in Uganda.
