= Nupserha quadrioculata =

Scientific classification
- Kingdom: Animalia
- Phylum: Arthropoda
- Clade: Pancrustacea
- Class: Insecta
- Order: Coleoptera
- Suborder: Polyphaga
- Infraorder: Cucujiformia
- Family: Cerambycidae
- Genus: Nupserha
- Species: N. quadrioculata

Binomial name
- Nupserha quadrioculata (Thunberg, 1787)

Synonyms
- Nupserha costata (Wiedemann, 1823); Nupserha quadripunctata Dejean, 1837; Saperda costata Wiedeman, 1823; Saperda quadrioculata Thunberg, 1787; Stibara carinata Thomson, 1857

Species of beetle

Nupserha quadrioculata is a species of beetle in the family Cerambycidae. It was described by Thunberg in 1787, originally under the genus Saperda. It is known from Laos, Indonesia, China, and Vietnam.

== Varietas ==
- Nupserha quadrioculata var. notaticeps Pic, 1926
- Nupserha quadrioculata var. corrugata Gressitt, 1940
