= Nupserha nigrolateralis =

Scientific classification
- Kingdom: Animalia
- Phylum: Arthropoda
- Class: Insecta
- Order: Coleoptera
- Suborder: Polyphaga
- Infraorder: Cucujiformia
- Family: Cerambycidae
- Genus: Nupserha
- Species: N. nigrolateralis

Binomial name
- Nupserha nigrolateralis Breuning, 1955

Species of beetle

Nupserha nigrolateralis is a species of beetle in the family Cerambycidae. It was described by Stephan von Breuning in 1955. It is known from Vietnam and Laos.

== Subspecies ==
- Nupserha nigrolateralis sericeosuturalis Breuning, 1960
- Nupserha nigrolateralis nigrolateralis Breuning, 1955
