= Nupserha laterifuga =

Scientific classification
- Domain: Eukaryota
- Kingdom: Animalia
- Phylum: Arthropoda
- Class: Insecta
- Order: Coleoptera
- Suborder: Polyphaga
- Infraorder: Cucujiformia
- Family: Cerambycidae
- Genus: Nupserha
- Species: N. laterifuga

Binomial name
- Nupserha laterifuga (Chevrolat, 1855)

Species of beetle

Nupserha laterifuga is a species of beetle in the family Cerambycidae. It was described by Louis Alexandre Auguste Chevrolat in 1855.

== Varietas ==
- Nupserha laterifuga var. frontalis (Jordan, 1894)
- Nupserha laterifuga var. apicebrunnea Breuning, 1950
- Nupserha laterifuga var. nigrifrons Lepesme & Breuning, 1953
- Nupserha laterifuga var. frontemaculata Breuning, 1958
- Nupserha laterifuga var. rutshurensis Breuning, 1952
- Nupserha laterifuga var. anticemaculata Breuning, 1950
