= Nupserha bivittata =

Scientific classification
- Kingdom: Animalia
- Phylum: Arthropoda
- Class: Insecta
- Order: Coleoptera
- Suborder: Polyphaga
- Infraorder: Cucujiformia
- Family: Cerambycidae
- Genus: Nupserha
- Species: N. bivittata

Binomial name
- Nupserha bivittata Aurivillius, 1907

Species of beetle

Nupserha bivittata is a species of beetle belonging to the family Cerambycidae. It was described by Per Olof Christopher Aurivillius in 1907.
