= Nupserha gestroi =

Scientific classification
- Kingdom: Animalia
- Phylum: Arthropoda
- Class: Insecta
- Order: Coleoptera
- Suborder: Polyphaga
- Infraorder: Cucujiformia
- Family: Cerambycidae
- Genus: Nupserha
- Species: N. gestroi

Binomial name
- Nupserha gestroi Breuning, 1950

Synonyms
- Synnupserha viitticollis Gestro, 1895 nec Kolbe, 1893

Species of beetle

Nupserha gestroi is a species of beetle in the family Cerambycidae. It was described by Stephan von Breuning in 1950.
