= Nupserha taliana =

Scientific classification
- Kingdom: Animalia
- Phylum: Arthropoda
- Class: Insecta
- Order: Coleoptera
- Suborder: Polyphaga
- Infraorder: Cucujiformia
- Family: Cerambycidae
- Genus: Nupserha
- Species: N. taliana

Binomial name
- Nupserha taliana (Pic, 1916)

Species of beetle

Nupserha taliana is a species of beetle in the family Cerambycidae. It was described by Maurice Pic in 1916.
