= Nupserha cerrutii =

Scientific classification
- Kingdom: Animalia
- Phylum: Arthropoda
- Class: Insecta
- Order: Coleoptera
- Suborder: Polyphaga
- Infraorder: Cucujiformia
- Family: Cerambycidae
- Genus: Nupserha
- Species: N. cerrutii

Binomial name
- Nupserha cerrutii Breuning, 1953

Synonyms
- Pseudeutetrapha rougemonti Breuning, 1977

Species of beetle

Nupserha cerrutii is a species of beetle in the family Cerambycidae. It was first described by Stephan von Breuning in 1953.
