= Nupserha sexpunctata =

Scientific classification
- Domain: Eukaryota
- Kingdom: Animalia
- Phylum: Arthropoda
- Class: Insecta
- Order: Coleoptera
- Suborder: Polyphaga
- Infraorder: Cucujiformia
- Family: Cerambycidae
- Genus: Nupserha
- Species: N. sexpunctata

Binomial name
- Nupserha sexpunctata (Chevrolat, 1857)

Species of beetle

Nupserha sexpunctata is a species of beetle in the family Cerambycidae. It was described by Louis Alexandre Auguste Chevrolat in 1857.

== Varietas ==
- Nupserha sexpunctata var. impuncticollis Breuning, 1950
- Nupserha sexpunctata var. bipuncticollis Breuning, 1950
