= Nupserha malabarensis =

Scientific classification
- Kingdom: Animalia
- Phylum: Arthropoda
- Class: Insecta
- Order: Coleoptera
- Suborder: Polyphaga
- Infraorder: Cucujiformia
- Family: Cerambycidae
- Genus: Nupserha
- Species: N. malabarensis

Binomial name
- Nupserha malabarensis Pic, 1939

Synonyms
- Nupserha malabarensis m. thoracica Gilmour, 1965; Nupserha malabarensis m. metafemoralis Gilmour, 1965; Nupserha malabarensis m. bivittipennis Breuning, 1963; Nupserha malabarensis m. deducta Gilmour, 1965; Nupserha malabarensis m. vittulata Gilmour, 1965

Species of beetle

Nupserha malabarensis is a species of beetle in the family Cerambycidae. It was described by Maurice Pic in 1939.

== Varietas ==
- Nupserha malabarensis var. nilghirica Breuning, 1954
- Nupserha malabarensis var. apicefemoralis Breuning, 1956
- Nupserha malabarensis var. patenigrescens Breuning, 1950
