= Carabus pedemontanus maurinensis =

Scientific classification
- Domain: Eukaryota
- Kingdom: Animalia
- Phylum: Arthropoda
- Class: Insecta
- Order: Coleoptera
- Suborder: Adephaga
- Family: Carabidae
- Genus: Carabus
- Species: C. pedemontanus
- Subspecies: C. p. maurinensis

Trinomial name
- Carabus pedemontanus maurinensis Deuve, 2002

Subspecies of beetle

Carabus pedemontanus maurinensis is a subspecies of black-coloured beetle from family Carabidae, that is endemic to France. Both sexes of the subspecies are 22 millimetres (0.87 in) long.
