= Nupserha nigricollis =

Scientific classification
- Kingdom: Animalia
- Phylum: Arthropoda
- Class: Insecta
- Order: Coleoptera
- Suborder: Polyphaga
- Infraorder: Cucujiformia
- Family: Cerambycidae
- Genus: Nupserha
- Species: N. nigricollis

Binomial name
- Nupserha nigricollis Breuning 1960

Species of beetle

Nupserha nigricollis is a species of beetle in the family Cerambycidae. It was described by Stephan von Breuning in 1960. The species is approximately 9 millimeters long and is found in India. Its holotype was a male beetle collected by Breuning in Assam in 1960.
