= Nupserha multimaculata =

Scientific classification
- Kingdom: Animalia
- Phylum: Arthropoda
- Class: Insecta
- Order: Coleoptera
- Suborder: Polyphaga
- Infraorder: Cucujiformia
- Family: Cerambycidae
- Genus: Nupserha
- Species: N. multimaculata

Binomial name
- Nupserha multimaculata Pic, 1939

Species of beetle

Nupserha multimaculata is a species of beetle in the family Cerambycidae. It was described by Maurice Pic in 1939.
