= Nupserha antennalis =

Scientific classification
- Domain: Eukaryota
- Kingdom: Animalia
- Phylum: Arthropoda
- Class: Insecta
- Order: Coleoptera
- Suborder: Polyphaga
- Infraorder: Cucujiformia
- Family: Cerambycidae
- Genus: Nupserha
- Species: N. antennalis

Binomial name
- Nupserha antennalis Jordan, 1894

Species of beetle

Nupserha antennalis is a species of beetle in the family Cerambycidae. It was described by Karl Jordan in 1894.

== Varieties ==
- Nupserha antennalis var. capitata Jordan, 1894
- Nupserha antennalis var. holonigripennis Breuning, 1950
- Nupserha antennalis var. obscurata Breuning, 1958
