= Nupserha variicornis =

Scientific classification
- Domain: Eukaryota
- Kingdom: Animalia
- Phylum: Arthropoda
- Class: Insecta
- Order: Coleoptera
- Suborder: Polyphaga
- Infraorder: Cucujiformia
- Family: Cerambycidae
- Genus: Nupserha
- Species: N. variicornis

Binomial name
- Nupserha variicornis (Hintz, 1919)

Synonyms
- Synnupserha variicornis Hintz, 1919

Species of beetle

Nupserha variicornis is a species of beetle in the family Cerambycidae. It was described by Hintz in 1919.
