= Nupserha kenyensis =

Scientific classification
- Kingdom: Animalia
- Phylum: Arthropoda
- Class: Insecta
- Order: Coleoptera
- Suborder: Polyphaga
- Infraorder: Cucujiformia
- Family: Cerambycidae
- Genus: Nupserha
- Species: N. kenyensis

Binomial name
- Nupserha kenyensis Breuning, 1958

Species of beetle

Nupserha kenyensis is a species of beetle in the family Cerambycidae. It was described by Stephan von Breuning in 1958.

== Subspecies ==
- Nupserha kenyensis kenyensis Breuning, 1958
- Nupserha kenyensis ethiopica Breuning, 1977
