= Nupserha acuta =

Scientific classification
- Domain: Eukaryota
- Kingdom: Animalia
- Phylum: Arthropoda
- Class: Insecta
- Order: Coleoptera
- Suborder: Polyphaga
- Infraorder: Cucujiformia
- Family: Cerambycidae
- Genus: Nupserha
- Species: N. acuta

Binomial name
- Nupserha acuta Holzschuh, 1986

Species of beetle

Nupserha acuta is a species of beetle in the family Cerambycidae. It was described by Holzschuh in 1986.
