= Nupserha homeyeri =

Scientific classification
- Domain: Eukaryota
- Kingdom: Animalia
- Phylum: Arthropoda
- Class: Insecta
- Order: Coleoptera
- Suborder: Polyphaga
- Infraorder: Cucujiformia
- Family: Cerambycidae
- Genus: Nupserha
- Species: N. homeyeri

Binomial name
- Nupserha homeyeri Harold, 1879

Synonyms
- Nupserha homeyeri m. postconjuncta Breuning, 1974; Nupserha homeyeri insulana Lepesme & Breuning, 1953

Species of beetle

Nupserha homeyeri is a species of beetle in the family Cerambycidae. It was described by Harold in 1879.

== Varietas ==
- Nupserha homeyeri var. nebulosa Breuning, 1950
- Nupserha homeyeri var. borana Müller, 1943
- Nupserha homeyeri var. longulipennis Breuning, 1949
- Nupserha homeyeri var. unicoloripennis Breuning, 1950
- Nupserha homeyeri var. obscura Breuning, 1956
- Nupserha homeyeri var. postscutellaris Breuning, 1950
- Nupserha homeyeri var. latenigra Breuning, 1949
