= Carabus pedemontanus omensis =

Scientific classification
- Domain: Eukaryota
- Kingdom: Animalia
- Phylum: Arthropoda
- Class: Insecta
- Order: Coleoptera
- Suborder: Adephaga
- Family: Carabidae
- Genus: Carabus
- Species: C. pedemontanus
- Subspecies: C. p. omensis

Trinomial name
- Carabus pedemontanus omensis Born, 1901

Subspecies of beetle

Carabus pedemontanus omensis is a subspecies of brown-coloured beetle from family Carabidae, that is endemic to Italy.
