= Nupserha marginella =

Scientific classification
- Domain: Eukaryota
- Kingdom: Animalia
- Phylum: Arthropoda
- Class: Insecta
- Order: Coleoptera
- Suborder: Polyphaga
- Infraorder: Cucujiformia
- Family: Cerambycidae
- Genus: Nupserha
- Species: N. marginella

Binomial name
- Nupserha marginella (Bates, 1873)

Synonyms
- Nupserha japonica Kraatz, 1879; Oberea marginella Bates, 1873

Species of beetle

Nupserha marginella is a species of beetle in the family Cerambycidae. It was described by Henry Walter Bates in 1873. It is known from Japan, Russia, Vietnam, Mongolia, China, North Korea, and South Korea.

== Subspecies ==
- Nupserha marginella marginella (Bates, 1873)
- Nupserha marginella binhensis Pic, 1926
