= Nupserha alexandrovi =

Scientific classification
- Domain: Eukaryota
- Kingdom: Animalia
- Phylum: Arthropoda
- Class: Insecta
- Order: Coleoptera
- Suborder: Polyphaga
- Infraorder: Cucujiformia
- Family: Cerambycidae
- Genus: Nupserha
- Species: N. alexandrovi

Binomial name
- Nupserha alexandrovi Plavilstshikov, 1915

Species of beetle

Nupserha alexandrovi is a species of beetle in the family Cerambycidae. It was described by Nikolay Nikolaevich Plavilstshchikov in 1915.
