= Nupserha conradti =

Scientific classification
- Domain: Eukaryota
- Kingdom: Animalia
- Phylum: Arthropoda
- Class: Insecta
- Order: Coleoptera
- Suborder: Polyphaga
- Infraorder: Cucujiformia
- Family: Cerambycidae
- Genus: Nupserha
- Species: N. conradti

Binomial name
- Nupserha conradti Kolbe, 1894

Species of beetle

Nupserha conradti is a species of beetle in the family Cerambycidae. It was described by Hermann Julius Kolbe in 1894.

== Varietas ==
- Nupserha conradti var. immaculatifrons Breuning, 1950
- Nupserha conradti var. atroabdominalis Breuning, 1961
