= Nupserha fumata =

Scientific classification
- Kingdom: Animalia
- Phylum: Arthropoda
- Class: Insecta
- Order: Coleoptera
- Suborder: Polyphaga
- Infraorder: Cucujiformia
- Family: Cerambycidae
- Genus: Nupserha
- Species: N. fumata

Binomial name
- Nupserha fumata (Heyden, 1897)

Synonyms
- Oberea fumata Heyden, 1897

Species of beetle

Nupserha fumata is a species of beetle in the family Cerambycidae. It was described by Heyden in 1897. It is known from Borneo.
