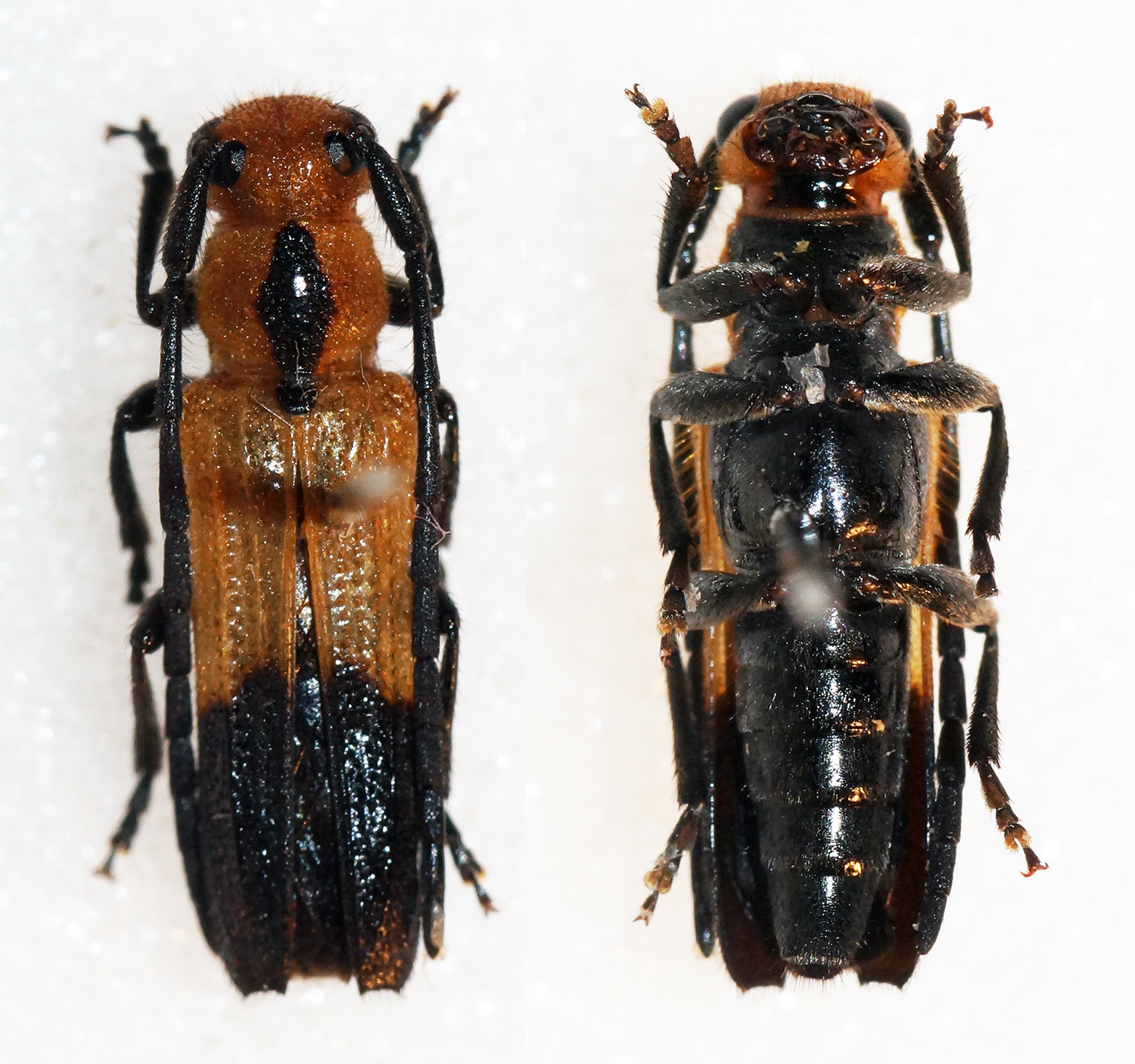

Scientific classification
- Domain: Eukaryota
- Kingdom: Animalia
- Phylum: Arthropoda
- Class: Insecta
- Order: Coleoptera
- Suborder: Polyphaga
- Infraorder: Cucujiformia
- Family: Cerambycidae
- Genus: Nupserha
- Species: N. nyassensis

Binomial name
- Nupserha nyassensis Aurivillius, 1914

= Nupserha nyassensis =

Species of beetle

Nupserha nyassensis is a species of beetle in the family Cerambycidae. It was described by Per Olof Christopher Aurivillius in 1914.

== Varietas ==
- Nupserha nyassensis var. bioccipitalis Breuning, 1950
- Nupserha nyassensis var. tanganyicae Breuning, 1958
- Nupserha nyassensis var. compacta Breuning, 1949
