= Carabus pedemontanus vesubianus =

Scientific classification
- Domain: Eukaryota
- Kingdom: Animalia
- Phylum: Arthropoda
- Class: Insecta
- Order: Coleoptera
- Suborder: Adephaga
- Family: Carabidae
- Genus: Carabus
- Species: C. pedemontanus
- Subspecies: C. p. vesubianus

Trinomial name
- Carabus pedemontanus vesubianus Deuve, 2002

Synonyms
- Carabus maritimus Schaum, 1856; Carabus putzeysianus

Subspecies of beetle

Carabus pedemontanus vesubianus is a subspecies of black-coloured beetle from family Carabidae, that can be found in France and Italy.
