= Nupserha flavonotum =

Scientific classification
- Domain: Eukaryota
- Kingdom: Animalia
- Phylum: Arthropoda
- Class: Insecta
- Order: Coleoptera
- Suborder: Polyphaga
- Infraorder: Cucujiformia
- Family: Cerambycidae
- Genus: Nupserha
- Species: N. flavonotum

Binomial name
- Nupserha flavonotum (Aurivillius, 1915)

Species of beetle

Nupserha flavonotum is a species of beetle in the family Cerambycidae. It was described by Per Olof Christopher Aurivillius in 1915.

== Subspecies ==
- Nupserha flavonotum occidentalis Breuning, 1961
- Nupserha flavonotum flavonotum (Aurivillius, 1915)
