= Nupserha ornaticollis =

Scientific classification
- Kingdom: Animalia
- Phylum: Arthropoda
- Class: Insecta
- Order: Coleoptera
- Suborder: Polyphaga
- Infraorder: Cucujiformia
- Family: Cerambycidae
- Genus: Nupserha
- Species: N. ornaticollis

Binomial name
- Nupserha ornaticollis Breuning, 1949

Species of beetle

Nupserha ornaticollis is a species of beetle in the family Cerambycidae. It was described by Stephan von Breuning in 1949.
