= Nupserha atriceps =

Scientific classification
- Kingdom: Animalia
- Phylum: Arthropoda
- Class: Insecta
- Order: Coleoptera
- Suborder: Polyphaga
- Infraorder: Cucujiformia
- Family: Cerambycidae
- Genus: Nupserha
- Species: N. atriceps

Binomial name
- Nupserha atriceps Breuning, 1948

Species of beetle

Nupserha atriceps is a species of beetle in the family Cerambycidae. It was described by Stephan von Breuning in 1948.

== Varietas ==
- Nupserha atriceps var. laterifusca Breuning, 1950
- Nupserha atriceps var. assamensis Breuning, 1950
- Nupserha atriceps var. subternigrescens Breuning, 1960
