= Nupserha clypealis =

Scientific classification
- Kingdom: Animalia
- Phylum: Arthropoda
- Class: Insecta
- Order: Coleoptera
- Suborder: Polyphaga
- Infraorder: Cucujiformia
- Family: Cerambycidae
- Genus: Nupserha
- Species: N. clypealis

Binomial name
- Nupserha clypealis (Fairmaire, 1895)

Synonyms
- Nupserha bisbinotaticollis Pic, 1917

Species of beetle

Nupserha clypealis is a species of beetle in the family Cerambycidae. It was described by Léon Fairmaire in 1895.

== Subspecies ==
- Nupserha clypealis formosana Breuning, 1960
- Nupserha clypealis clypealis (Fairmaire, 1895)
