= Nupserha bicolor =

Scientific classification
- Domain: Eukaryota
- Kingdom: Animalia
- Phylum: Arthropoda
- Class: Insecta
- Order: Coleoptera
- Suborder: Polyphaga
- Infraorder: Cucujiformia
- Family: Cerambycidae
- Genus: Nupserha
- Species: N. bicolor

Binomial name
- Nupserha bicolor (Thomson, 1857)

Synonyms
- Stibara bicolor Thomson, 1857

Species of beetle

Nupserha bicolor is a species of beetle in the family Cerambycidae. It was described by James Thomson in 1857.

== Varietas ==
- Nupserha bicolor var. postbrunnea Dutt, 1952
- Nupserha bicolor var. nigrata Breuning, 1950
- Nupserha bicolor var. thomsoni Breuning, 1960
- Nupserha bicolor var. subnitida Breuning, 1960
- Nupserha bicolor var. parteatriventris Breuning, 1960
