= Nupserha hintzi =

Scientific classification
- Domain: Eukaryota
- Kingdom: Animalia
- Phylum: Arthropoda
- Class: Insecta
- Order: Coleoptera
- Suborder: Polyphaga
- Infraorder: Cucujiformia
- Family: Cerambycidae
- Genus: Nupserha
- Species: N. hintzi

Binomial name
- Nupserha hintzi Aurivillius, 1923

Species of beetle

Nupserha hintzi is a species of beetle in the family Cerambycidae. It was described by Per Olof Christopher Aurivillius in 1923.

== Varietas ==
- Nupserha hintzi var. nigritarsis Breuning, 1955
- Nupserha hintzi var. flavotibialis Breuning, 1958
- Nupserha hintzi var. atritarsis Breuning, 1950
- Nupserha hintzi var. tuberculatithorax Breuning, 1958
