= Nupserha longipennis =

Scientific classification
- Kingdom: Animalia
- Phylum: Arthropoda
- Class: Insecta
- Order: Coleoptera
- Suborder: Polyphaga
- Infraorder: Cucujiformia
- Family: Cerambycidae
- Genus: Nupserha
- Species: N. longipennis

Binomial name
- Nupserha longipennis Pic, 1926

Species of beetle

Nupserha longipennis is a species of beetle in the family Cerambycidae. It was described by Maurice Pic in 1926.
