= Nupserha apicata =

Scientific classification
- Kingdom: Animalia
- Phylum: Arthropoda
- Class: Insecta
- Order: Coleoptera
- Suborder: Polyphaga
- Infraorder: Cucujiformia
- Family: Cerambycidae
- Genus: Nupserha
- Species: N. apicata

Binomial name
- Nupserha apicata Fairmaire, 1891

Synonyms
- Synnupserha meruana Aurivillius, 1908; Synnupserha abyssinica Aurivillius, 1911; Synnupserha variabilis Hintz, 1911 nec Gahan, 1894

Species of beetle

Nupserha apicata is a species of beetle in the family Cerambycidae. It was described by Léon Fairmaire in 1891.

== Varietas ==
- Nupserha apicata var. elgonensis (Aurivillius, 1914)
- Nupserha apicata var. albovitticollis Breuning, 1960
- Nupserha apicata var. fuscoampiata Breuning, 1958
- Nupserha apicata var. atricornis Breuning, 1956
- Nupserha apicata var. cinerascens Aurivillius, 1925
- Nupserha apicata var. cruciata (Aurivillius, 1914)
- Nupserha apicata var. apicefusca Breuning, 1953
- Nupserha apicata var. latesuturalis Breuning, 1950
- Nupserha apicata var. inapicata Breuning, 1958
- Nupserha apicata var. invittata Breuning, 1958
- Nupserha apicata var. subgracilis Breuning, 1950
- Nupserha apicata var. mediolatevittata Breuning, 1953
- Nupserha apicata var. kivuensis Breuning, 1956
- Nupserha apicata var. lateriflava Breuning, 1950
- Nupserha apicata var. apicaloides Breuning, 1949
- Nupserha apicata var. latevittata Breuning, 1950
- Nupserha apicata var. mediofuscipennis Breuning, 1956
- Nupserha apicata var. subhumerovittata Breuning, 1953
- Nupserha apicata var. vagemaculata Breuning, 1950
- Nupserha apicata var. nigrescens Breuning, 1958
- Nupserha apicata var. nigroantennata Breuning, 1958
- Nupserha apicata var. presuturevittata Breuning, 1958
- Nupserha apicata var. pseudapicata Breuning, 1958
- Nupserha apicata var. fordi Duffy, 1953
- Nupserha apicata var. lateriinfusca Breuning, 1958
- Nupserha apicata var. subvariabilis Breuning, 1958
- Nupserha apicata var. suturelineata Breuning, 1950
- Nupserha apicata var. transversicollis Breuning, 1950
- Nupserha apicata var. unicolor Aurivillius, 1926
- Nupserha apicata var. subcruciata Breuning, 1950
