= Nupserha grisea =

Scientific classification
- Domain: Eukaryota
- Kingdom: Animalia
- Phylum: Arthropoda
- Class: Insecta
- Order: Coleoptera
- Suborder: Polyphaga
- Infraorder: Cucujiformia
- Family: Cerambycidae
- Genus: Nupserha
- Species: N. grisea

Binomial name
- Nupserha grisea (Aurivillius, 1914)

Synonyms
- Synnupserha strigicollis var. grisea Aurivillius, 1914; Nupserha grisea m. binigrovittipennis Breuning, 1963

Species of beetle

Nupserha grisea is a species of beetle in the family Cerambycidae. It was described by Per Olof Christopher Aurivillius in 1914.

== Varietas ==
- Nupserha grisea var. rufobasiantennata Breuning, 1958
- Nupserha grisea var. basivittata Breuning, 1953
- Nupserha grisea var. subgrisea Breuning, 1953
