= Nupserha pallidipennis =

Scientific classification
- Domain: Eukaryota
- Kingdom: Animalia
- Phylum: Arthropoda
- Class: Insecta
- Order: Coleoptera
- Suborder: Polyphaga
- Infraorder: Cucujiformia
- Family: Cerambycidae
- Genus: Nupserha
- Species: N. pallidipennis

Binomial name
- Nupserha pallidipennis (Redtenbacher, 1858)

Synonyms
- Nupserha flavipennis Breuning, 1950; Phytoecia pallidipennis Redtenbacher, 1858; Obereopsis pallidipennis (Redtenbacher, 1858)

Species of beetle

Nupserha pallidipennis is a species of beetle in the family Cerambycidae. It was described by Redtenbacher in 1858, originally under the genus Phytoecia. It is known from Nepal, Bhutan, Myanmar, and India.

== Subspecies ==
- Nupserha pallidipennis pallidipennis (Redtenbacher, 1858)
- Nupserha pallidipennis flavipennis Breuning, 1950
