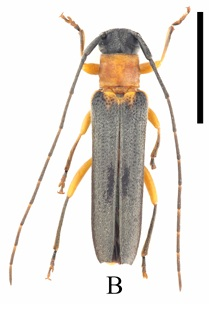

Scientific classification
- Kingdom: Animalia
- Phylum: Arthropoda
- Class: Insecta
- Order: Coleoptera
- Suborder: Polyphaga
- Infraorder: Cucujiformia
- Family: Cerambycidae
- Genus: Nupserha
- Species: N. infantula

Binomial name
- Nupserha infantula (Ganglbauer, 1889)

Synonyms
- Oberea infantula Ganglbauer, 1889; Nupserha bisbinotata Pic, 1928; Nupserha subvelutina Gressitt, 1937; Oberea infantula a. suensoni Heyrovský, 1939

= Nupserha infantula =

Species of beetle

Nupserha infantula is a species of beetle in the family Cerambycidae. It was described by Ganglbauer in 1889, originally under the genus Oberea. This species is found in China (Sichuan, Hubei, Shaanxi, Yunnan, Gansu, Guizhou, Hebei, Hunan, Zhejiang, Guangxi, Fujian, Jiangxi, Guangdong).

== Varietas ==
- Nupserha infantula var. subvelutina Gressitt, 1937
- Nupserha infantula var. flavoantennalis Breuning, 1947
- Nupserha infantula var. flavoabdominalis Breuning, 1947
- Nupserha infantula var. thienmushana Breuning, 1960
- Nupserha infantula var. szetschuana Breuning, 1947
