= Nupserha basalis =

Scientific classification
- Kingdom: Animalia
- Phylum: Arthropoda
- Class: Insecta
- Order: Coleoptera
- Suborder: Polyphaga
- Infraorder: Cucujiformia
- Family: Cerambycidae
- Genus: Nupserha
- Species: N. basalis

Binomial name
- Nupserha basalis (Erichson, 1843)

Species of beetle

Nupserha basalis is a species of beetle in the family Cerambycidae. It was described by Wilhelm Ferdinand Erichson in 1843. It has a wide distribution in Africa.

== Subspecies ==
- Nupserha basalis basalis (Erichson, 1843)
- Nupserha basalis apicalis (Fahraeus, 1872)
- Nupserha basalis urundiensis Breuning, 1955
- Nupserha basalis quadripunctata Lepesme & Breuning, 1952
- Nupserha basalis rufifrons Breuning, 1981
