= Nupserha nigrohumeralis =

Scientific classification
- Kingdom: Animalia
- Phylum: Arthropoda
- Class: Insecta
- Order: Coleoptera
- Suborder: Polyphaga
- Infraorder: Cucujiformia
- Family: Cerambycidae
- Genus: Nupserha
- Species: N. nigrohumeralis

Binomial name
- Nupserha nigrohumeralis Pic, 1927

Species of beetle

Nupserha nigrohumeralis is a species of beetle in the family Cerambycidae. It was described by Maurice Pic in 1927. It is known from Vietnam.
