= Nupserha convergens =

Scientific classification
- Domain: Eukaryota
- Kingdom: Animalia
- Phylum: Arthropoda
- Class: Insecta
- Order: Coleoptera
- Suborder: Polyphaga
- Infraorder: Cucujiformia
- Family: Cerambycidae
- Genus: Nupserha
- Species: N. convergens

Binomial name
- Nupserha convergens (Aurivillius, 1914)

Synonyms
- Synnupserha convergens Aurivillius, 1914

Species of beetle

Nupserha convergens is a species of beetle in the family Cerambycidae. It was described by Per Olof Christopher Aurivillius in 1914.

== Varietas ==
- Nupserha convergens var. pseudogracilis Breuning, 1955
- Nupserha convergens var. gezei Villiers, 1941
- Nupserha convergens var. invitticollis Breuning, 1949
- Nupserha convergens var. fuscoapicata Breuning, 1950
- Nupserha convergens var. subapicata Breuning, 1958
- Nupserha convergens var. flavinotum Aurivillius, 1914
