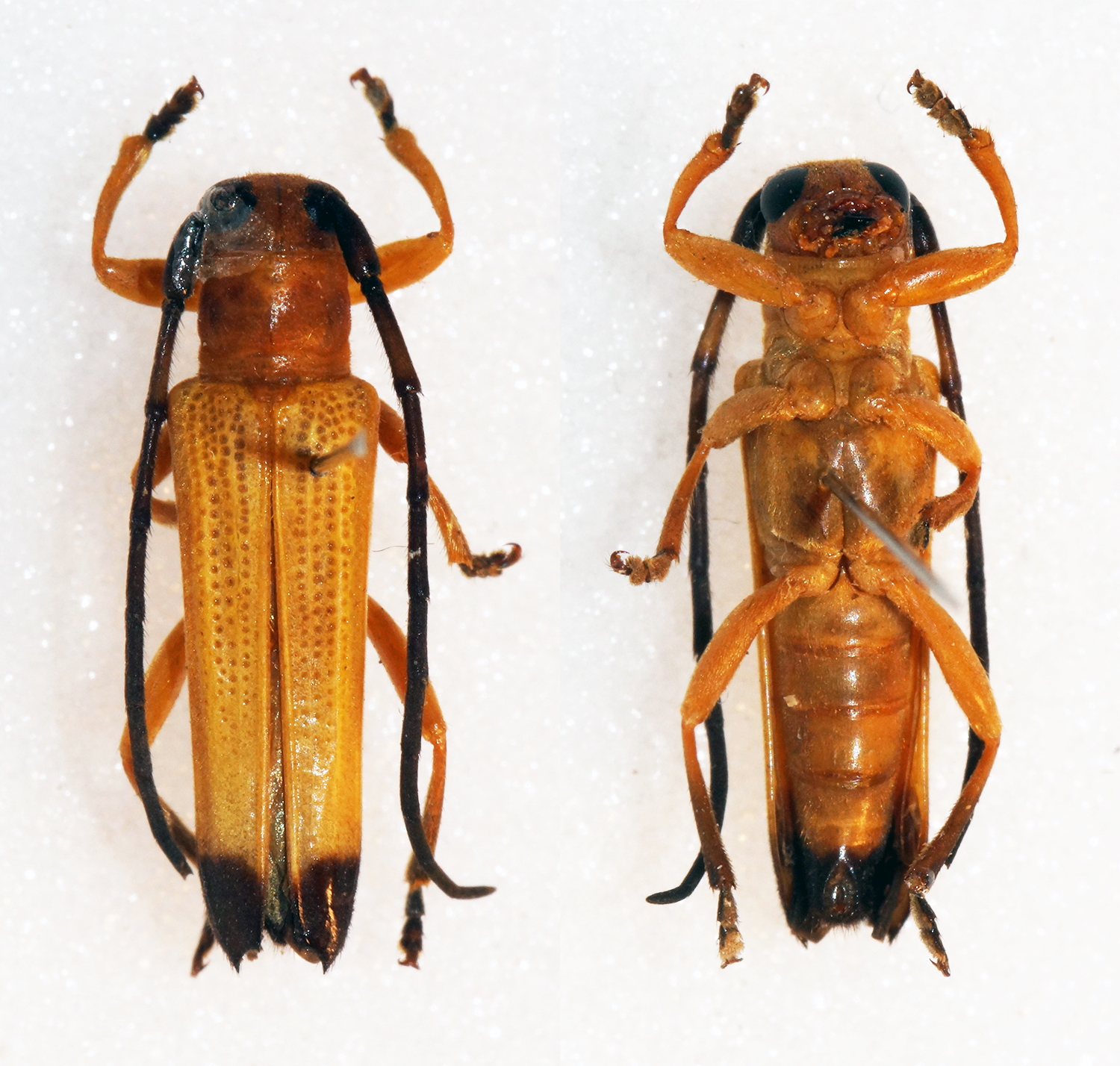

Scientific classification
- Kingdom: Animalia
- Phylum: Arthropoda
- Class: Insecta
- Order: Coleoptera
- Suborder: Polyphaga
- Infraorder: Cucujiformia
- Family: Cerambycidae
- Genus: Nupserha
- Species: N. ustulata

Binomial name
- Nupserha ustulata (Erichson, 1834)

Synonyms
- Nupserha grandis Pic, 1939; ?Stibara cosmopolita Thomson, 1857; Saperda ustulata Erichson, 1834 nec Hagenbach, 1822

= Nupserha ustulata =

Species of beetle

Nupserha ustulata is a species of beetle in the family Cerambycidae. It was described by Wilhelm Ferdinand Erichson in 1834. It is known from the Philippines and Malaysia.

== Subspecies ==
- Nupserha ustulata ustulata (Erichson, 1834)
- Nupserha ustulata palawanensis Breuning, 1960
- Nupserha ustulata borneensis Breuning, 1960
- Nupserha ustulata mindanaonis Breuning, 1960
- Nupserha ustulata boholensis Breuning, 1960
