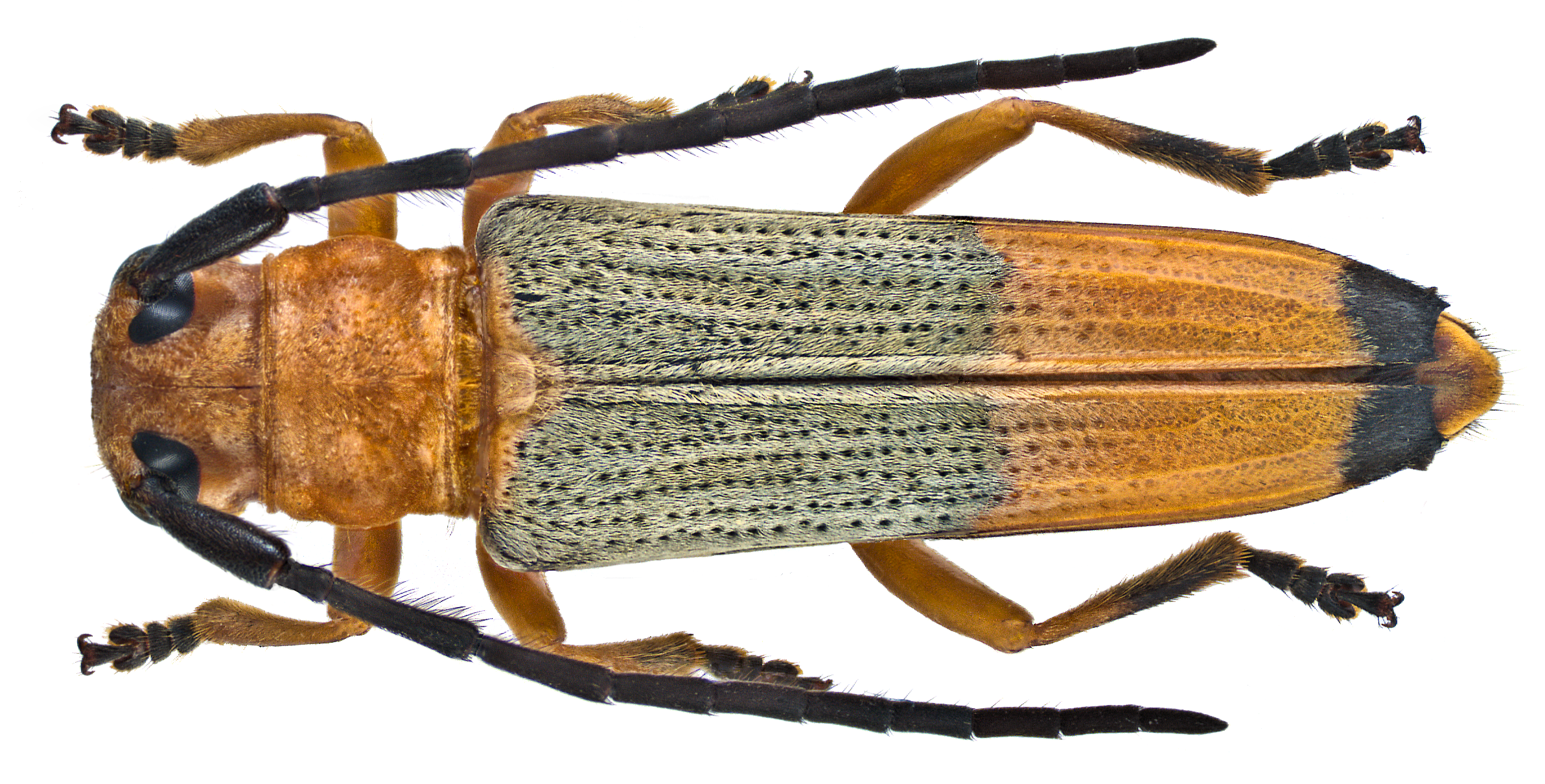

Scientific classification
- Domain: Eukaryota
- Kingdom: Animalia
- Phylum: Arthropoda
- Class: Insecta
- Order: Coleoptera
- Suborder: Polyphaga
- Infraorder: Cucujiformia
- Family: Cerambycidae
- Genus: Nupserha
- Species: N. variabilis

Binomial name
- Nupserha variabilis Gahan, 1894

Synonyms
- Stibara apicalis Pic, 1925

= Nupserha variabilis =

Species of beetle

Nupserha variabilis is a species of beetle in the family Cerambycidae. It was described by Charles Joseph Gahan in 1894. It is known from Thailand, India, China, Myanmar, Vietnam, and Laos. It feeds on Thunbergia grandiflora and Tectona grandis. The species contains the varietas Nupserha variabilis var. latestacea.
