= Nupserha tricolor =

Scientific classification
- Domain: Eukaryota
- Kingdom: Animalia
- Phylum: Arthropoda
- Class: Insecta
- Order: Coleoptera
- Suborder: Polyphaga
- Infraorder: Cucujiformia
- Family: Cerambycidae
- Genus: Nupserha
- Species: N. tricolor

Binomial name
- Nupserha tricolor Aurivillius, 1920

Species of beetle

Nupserha tricolor is a species of beetle in the family Cerambycidae. It was described by Per Olof Christopher Aurivillius in 1920.
