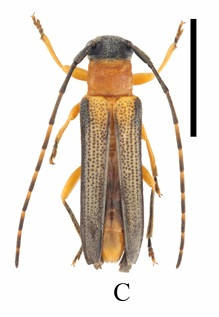

Scientific classification
- Kingdom: Animalia
- Phylum: Arthropoda
- Class: Insecta
- Order: Coleoptera
- Suborder: Polyphaga
- Infraorder: Cucujiformia
- Family: Cerambycidae
- Genus: Nupserha
- Species: N. testaceipes

Binomial name
- Nupserha testaceipes Pic, 1926

Synonyms
- Nupserha testaceipes Pic, 1926; Nupserha batesi Gressitt, 1937; Nupserha testaceipes m. basinigra Breuning, 1960; Nupserha testaceipes m. unicoloricornis Breuning, 1961

= Nupserha testaceipes =

Species of beetle

Nupserha testaceipes is a species of beetle in the family Cerambycidae. It was described by Maurice Pic in 1926. This species is found in China (Sichuan, Hubei, Guizhou, Heilongjiang, Jilin, Guangxi, Hainan, Shandong, Guangdong, Gansu, Fujian, Hunan, Jiangsu, Jiangxi, Zhejiang, Anhui).
