= Nupserha nigriceps =

Scientific classification
- Domain: Eukaryota
- Kingdom: Animalia
- Phylum: Arthropoda
- Class: Insecta
- Order: Coleoptera
- Suborder: Polyphaga
- Infraorder: Cucujiformia
- Family: Cerambycidae
- Genus: Nupserha
- Species: N. nigriceps

Binomial name
- Nupserha nigriceps Gahan, 1894

Species of beetle

Nupserha nigriceps is a species of beetle in the family Cerambycidae. It was described by Charles Joseph Gahan in 1894. It is known from Myanmar, Laos, Malaysia, and Vietnam.

Overall, Asia has 67 species plus 13 subspecies of Nupserha which includes various countries such as India having 29 species plus 1 subspecies spread over different states, China having 32 species and 1 subspecie, South Asia having 28 species and 4 subspecies, SE Asia having 47 species and 9 subspecies, and North Asia having 4 species of Nupserha.
