= Nupserha punctata =

Scientific classification
- Domain: Eukaryota
- Kingdom: Animalia
- Phylum: Arthropoda
- Class: Insecta
- Order: Coleoptera
- Suborder: Polyphaga
- Infraorder: Cucujiformia
- Family: Cerambycidae
- Genus: Nupserha
- Species: N. punctata

Binomial name
- Nupserha punctata Jordan, 1894

Species of beetle

Nupserha punctata is a species of beetle in the family Cerambycidae. It was described by Karl Jordan in 1894.

== Varieties ==
- Nupserha punctata var. seminigripennis Breuning, 1950
- Nupserha punctata var. parterufiventris Breuning, 1950
