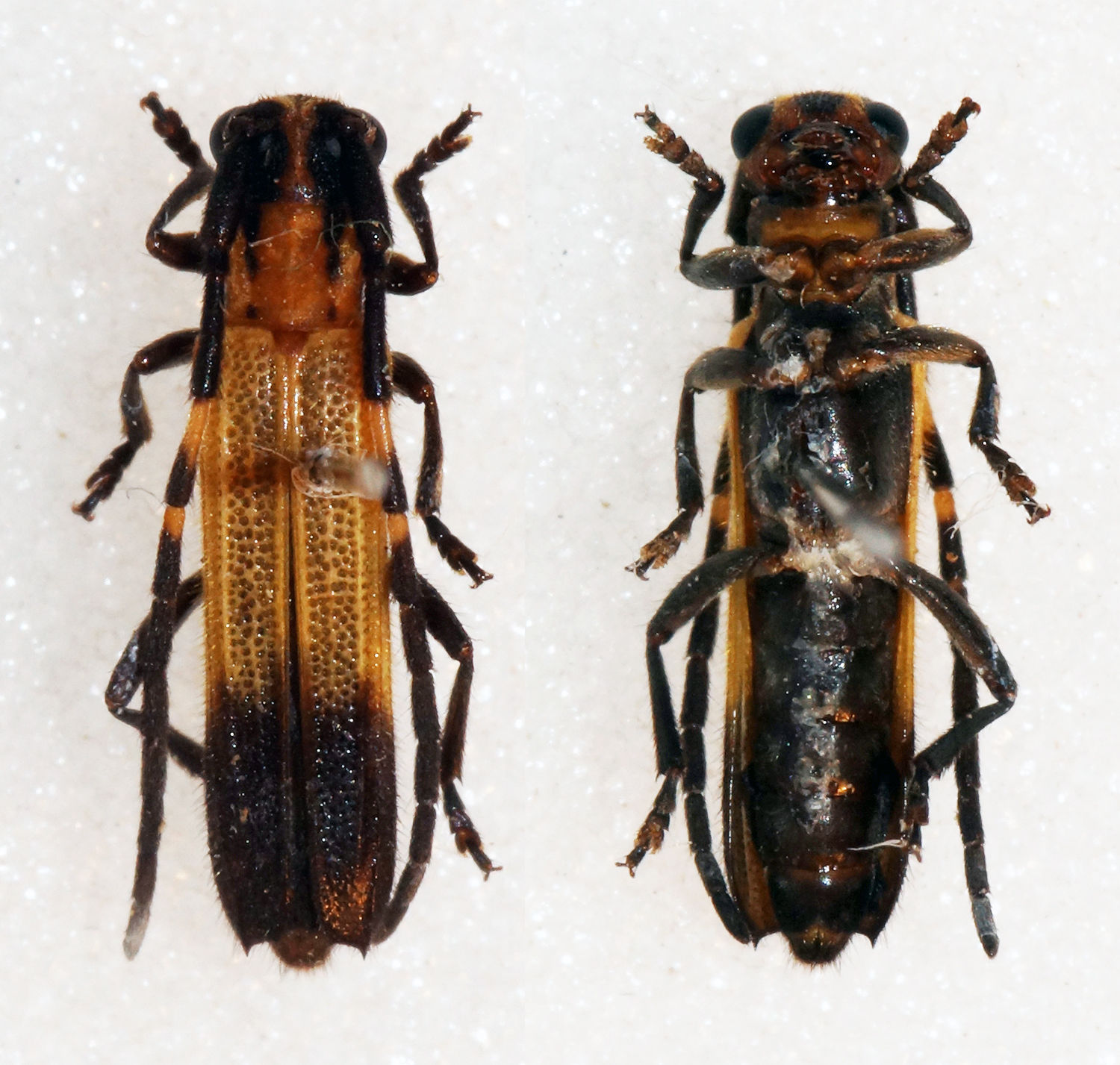

Scientific classification
- Domain: Eukaryota
- Kingdom: Animalia
- Phylum: Arthropoda
- Class: Insecta
- Order: Coleoptera
- Suborder: Polyphaga
- Infraorder: Cucujiformia
- Family: Cerambycidae
- Genus: Nupserha
- Species: N. vitticollis

Binomial name
- Nupserha vitticollis (Kolbe, 1893)

Synonyms
- Synnupserha vitticollis Kolbe, 1893; Nupserha vitticollis m. antenigra Teocchi, 1998; Nupserha elongata m. rufifrons Breuning, 1964; Nupserha vitticollis vitticollis (Kolbe, 1893); Nupserha vitticollis m. anteflava Teocchi, 1998

= Nupserha vitticollis =

Species of beetle

Nupserha vitticollis is a species of beetle in the family Cerambycidae. It was described by Hermann Julius Kolbe in 1893. It is known from Tanzania, the Democratic Republic of the Congo, Cameroon, Uganda, and Togo.

== Varietas ==
- Nupserha vitticollis var. elongata (Kolbe, 1893)
- Nupserha vitticollis var. camerunica (Aurivillius, 1914)
- Nupserha vitticollis var. gaskini (Villiers, 1941)
- Nupserha vitticollis var. pseudofrontalis Breuning, 1950
- Nupserha vitticollis var. insularis Breuning, 1950
- Nupserha vitticollis var. quadripunctulata Breuning, 1950
- Nupserha vitticollis var. holoxantha (Aurivillius, 1914)
