= Nupserha univitticollis =

Scientific classification
- Kingdom: Animalia
- Phylum: Arthropoda
- Class: Insecta
- Order: Coleoptera
- Suborder: Polyphaga
- Infraorder: Cucujiformia
- Family: Cerambycidae
- Genus: Nupserha
- Species: N. univitticollis

Binomial name
- Nupserha univitticollis Breuning, 1958

Species of beetle

Nupserha univitticollis is a species of beetle in the family Cerambycidae. It was described by Stephan von Breuning in 1958.
