= Nupserha lenita =

Scientific classification
- Domain: Eukaryota
- Kingdom: Animalia
- Phylum: Arthropoda
- Class: Insecta
- Order: Coleoptera
- Suborder: Polyphaga
- Infraorder: Cucujiformia
- Family: Cerambycidae
- Genus: Nupserha
- Species: N. lenita

Binomial name
- Nupserha lenita (Pascoe, 1867)

Synonyms
- Glenea lenita Pascoe, 1867

Species of beetle

Nupserha lenita is a species of beetle in the family Cerambycidae. It was described by Francis Polkinghorne Pascoe in 1867. It is known from Myanmar, India, Thailand, Malaysia, and Vietnam.

== Varietas ==
- Nupserha lenita var. bilatevittata Breuning, 1950
- Nupserha lenita var. siamensis Breuning, 1955
- Nupserha lenita var. ambigena Lameere, 1893
- Nupserha lenita var. annamensis Pic, 1939
- Nupserha lenita var. sikkimensis Breuning, 1960
