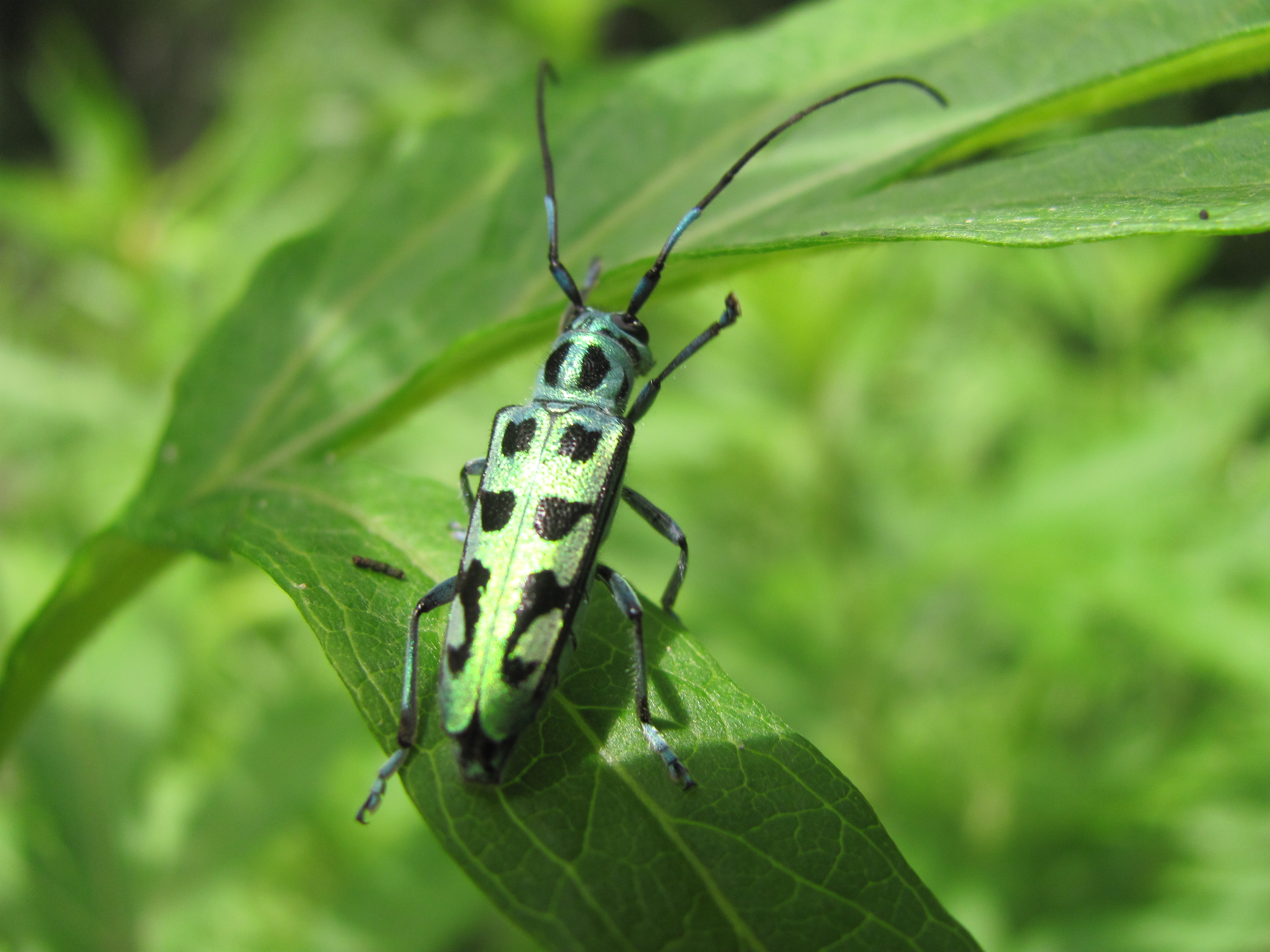

Scientific classification
- Kingdom: Animalia
- Phylum: Arthropoda
- Class: Insecta
- Order: Coleoptera
- Suborder: Polyphaga
- Infraorder: Cucujiformia
- Family: Cerambycidae
- Genus: Eutetrapha
- Species: E. chrysochloris

Binomial name
- Eutetrapha chrysochloris (Bates, 1879)

Synonyms
- Glenea chrysochloris (Bates, 1879); Paraglenea chrysochloris Bates, 1879

= Eutetrapha chrysochloris =

Species of beetle

Eutetrapha chrysochloris is a species of beetle in the family Cerambycidae. It was described by Henry Walter Bates in 1879, originally under the genus Paraglenea.
