= Paraglenea swinhoei =

Scientific classification
- Domain: Eukaryota
- Kingdom: Animalia
- Phylum: Arthropoda
- Class: Insecta
- Order: Coleoptera
- Suborder: Polyphaga
- Infraorder: Cucujiformia
- Family: Cerambycidae
- Genus: Paraglenea
- Species: P. swinhoei

Binomial name
- Paraglenea swinhoei Bates, 1866

Species of beetle

Paraglenea swinhoei is a species of beetle in the family Cerambycidae. It was described by Henry Walter Bates in 1866. It is known from Taiwan and China.

== Subspecies ==
- Paraglenea swinhoei swinhoei Bates, 1866
- Paraglenea swinhoei continentalis Breuning, 1952
