= Paraglenea velutinofasciata =

Scientific classification
- Kingdom: Animalia
- Phylum: Arthropoda
- Class: Insecta
- Order: Coleoptera
- Suborder: Polyphaga
- Infraorder: Cucujiformia
- Family: Cerambycidae
- Genus: Paraglenea
- Species: P. velutinofasciata

Binomial name
- Paraglenea velutinofasciata (Pic, 1939)

Synonyms
- Paraglenea velutinofasciata (Pic, 1939); Paraglenea nigromaculata Wang & Jiang, 2002

Species of beetle

Paraglenea velutinofasciata is a species of beetle in the family Cerambycidae. It was described by Maurice Pic in 1939.
