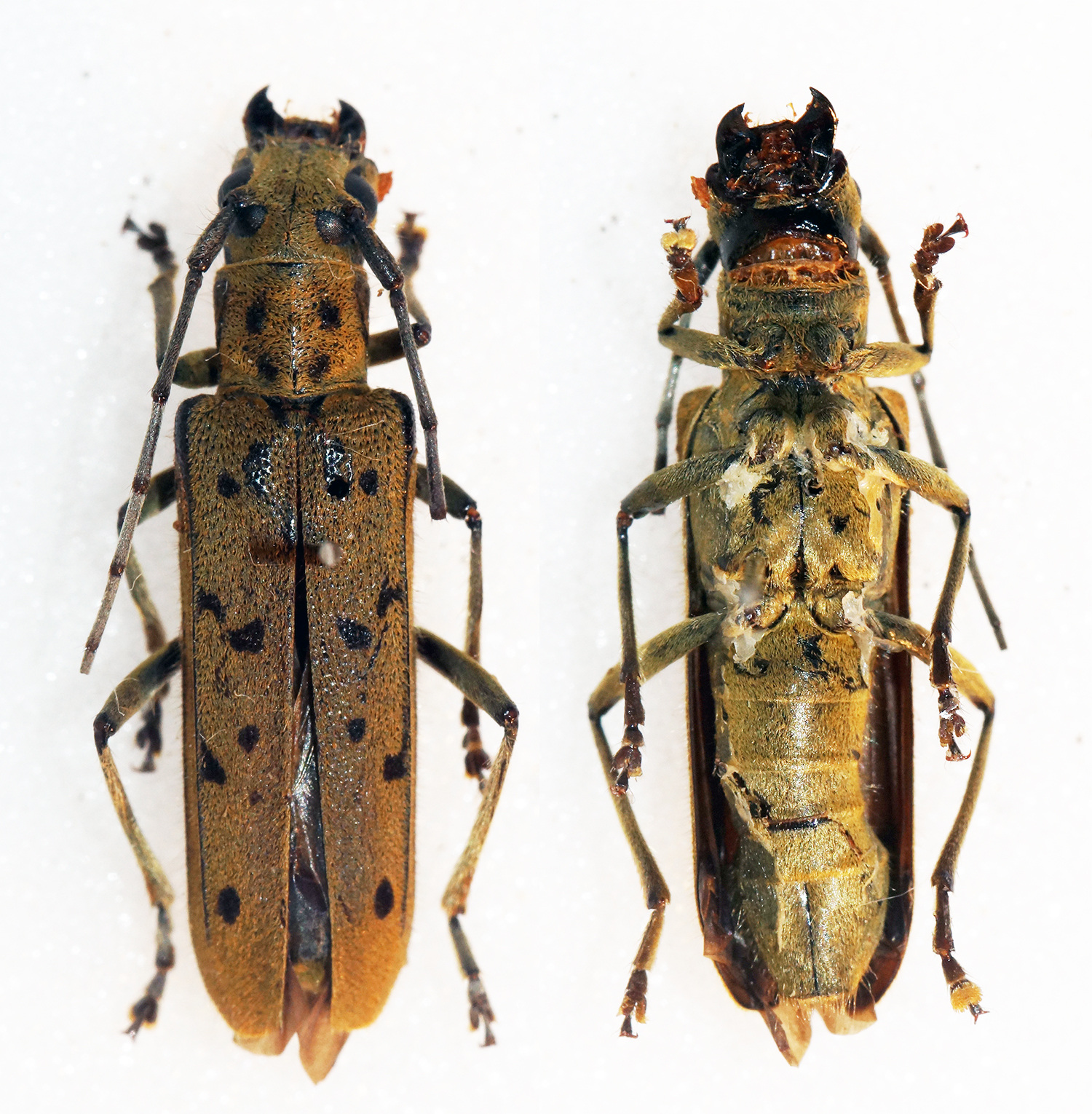

Scientific classification
- Kingdom: Animalia
- Phylum: Arthropoda
- Class: Insecta
- Order: Coleoptera
- Suborder: Polyphaga
- Infraorder: Cucujiformia
- Family: Cerambycidae
- Genus: Eutetrapha
- Species: E. sedecimpunctata

Binomial name
- Eutetrapha sedecimpunctata (Motschulsky, 1860)

Synonyms
- Saperda sedecimpunctata Motschulsky, 1860; Eutetrapha variicornis Bates, 1884; Eutetrapha duodecimpunctata (Motschulsky) Heyden, 1885; Saperda carinata Blessig, 1872; Saperda duodecimpunctata Motschulsky, 1860; Saperda motschulskyi Breuning, 1952; Saperda sulphurata Matsumura, 1906

= Eutetrapha sedecimpunctata =

Species of beetle

Eutetrapha sedecimpunctata is a species of beetle in the family Cerambycidae. It was described by Victor Motschulsky in 1860, originally under the genus Saperda. It is known from North Korea, Russia, Japan, and China.

== Subspecies ==
- Eutetrapha sedecimpunctata australis Takakuwa & Hirokawa, 1998
- Eutetrapha sedecimpunctata sedecimpunctata (Motschulsky, 1860)
