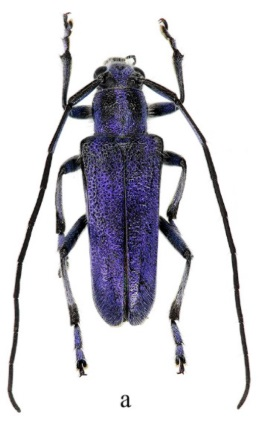
- male
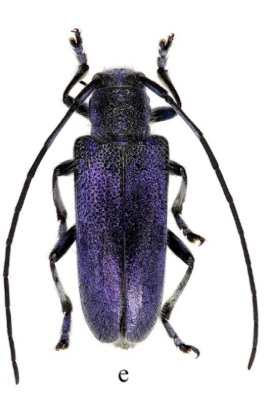
- female

Scientific classification
- Kingdom: Animalia
- Phylum: Arthropoda
- Class: Insecta
- Order: Coleoptera
- Suborder: Polyphaga
- Infraorder: Cucujiformia
- Family: Cerambycidae
- Genus: Paraglenea
- Species: P. dairanxingorum

Binomial name
- Paraglenea dairanxingorum Lin, You & Wang, 2025

= Paraglenea dairanxingorum =

Species of beetle

Paraglenea dairanxingorum is a species of beetle of the family Cerambycidae. It is found in China (Hunan and Hubei).

== Description ==
Adults reach a length of about 10–18.6 mm. They have a black body, covered with dense erect white hairs and metallic purple to blue scales except some black markings.

== Etymology ==
The species is dedicated to three persons from the collector's family, Mr. Chao Dai who collected most of the type specimens, and his two sons.
