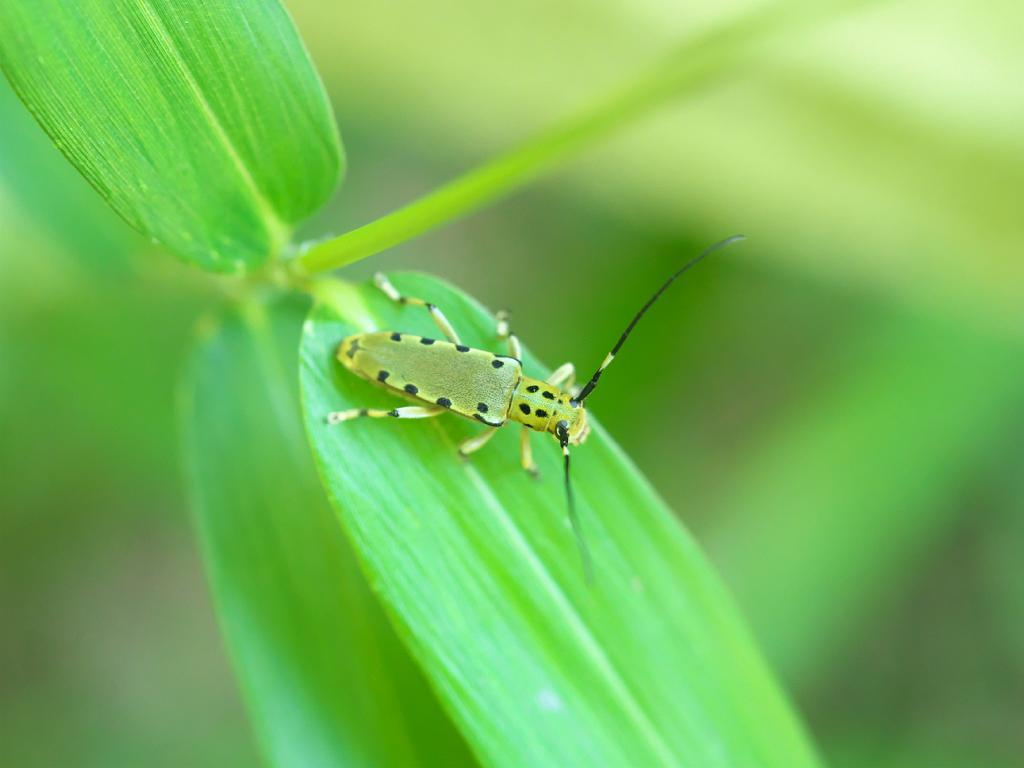

Scientific classification
- Kingdom: Animalia
- Phylum: Arthropoda
- Class: Insecta
- Order: Coleoptera
- Suborder: Polyphaga
- Infraorder: Cucujiformia
- Family: Cerambycidae
- Genus: Eutetrapha
- Species: E. ocelota

Binomial name
- Eutetrapha ocelota (Bates, 1873)

Synonyms
- Eutetrapha maculithorax Pic, 1900; Glenea ocelota Bates, 1873

= Eutetrapha ocelota =

Species of beetle

Eutetrapha ocelota is a species of beetle in the family Cerambycidae. It was described by Henry Walter Bates in 1873, originally under the genus Glenea. It is known from Taiwan and Japan.
