= Eutetrapha lini =

Scientific classification
- Kingdom: Animalia
- Phylum: Arthropoda
- Class: Insecta
- Order: Coleoptera
- Suborder: Polyphaga
- Infraorder: Cucujiformia
- Family: Cerambycidae
- Genus: Eutetrapha
- Species: E. lini

Binomial name
- Eutetrapha lini Chou, Chung & Lin, 2014

Species of beetle

Eutetrapha lini is a species of beetle in the family Cerambycidae. It was described by Chou, Chung and Lin in 2014. It is known from Taiwan.
