= Eutetrapha cinnabarina =

Scientific classification
- Kingdom: Animalia
- Phylum: Arthropoda
- Class: Insecta
- Order: Coleoptera
- Suborder: Polyphaga
- Infraorder: Cucujiformia
- Family: Cerambycidae
- Genus: Eutetrapha
- Species: E. cinnabarina

Binomial name
- Eutetrapha cinnabarina Pu, 1986

Species of beetle

Eutetrapha cinnabarina is a species of beetle in the family Cerambycidae. It was described by Pu in 1986.
