= Eutetrapha striolata =

Eutetrapha striolata Temporal range: Middle Miocene

Scientific classification
- Kingdom: Animalia
- Phylum: Arthropoda
- Class: Insecta
- Order: Coleoptera
- Suborder: Polyphaga
- Infraorder: Cucujiformia
- Family: Cerambycidae
- Genus: Eutetrapha
- Species: †E. striolata

Binomial name
- †Eutetrapha striolata Zhang J. F., 1989 †

Species of beetle

Eutetrapha striolata is an extinct species of beetle in the family Cerambycidae, that existed during the Middle Miocene in what is now China. It was described by Zhang J. F. in 1989.
