= Paraglenea latefasciata =

Scientific classification
- Kingdom: Animalia
- Phylum: Arthropoda
- Class: Insecta
- Order: Coleoptera
- Suborder: Polyphaga
- Infraorder: Cucujiformia
- Family: Cerambycidae
- Genus: Paraglenea
- Species: P. latefasciata

Binomial name
- Paraglenea latefasciata Breuning, 1952

Species of beetle

Paraglenea latefasciata is a species of beetle in the family Cerambycidae. It was described by Stephan von Breuning in 1952. It is known from Vietnam.
