= Eutetrapha terenia =

Eutetrapha terenia Temporal range: Middle Miocene

Scientific classification
- Kingdom: Animalia
- Phylum: Arthropoda
- Class: Insecta
- Order: Coleoptera
- Suborder: Polyphaga
- Infraorder: Cucujiformia
- Family: Cerambycidae
- Genus: Eutetrapha
- Species: †E. terenia

Binomial name
- †Eutetrapha terenia Zhang J. F., Sun B. & Zhang X., 1994 †

Species of beetle

Eutetrapha terenia is an extinct species of beetle in the family Cerambycidae, that existed during the Middle Miocene in what is now China. It was described by Zhang J. F., Sun B. and Zhang X. in 1994.
