= Eutetrapha nephele =

Eutetrapha nephele Temporal range: Upper Miocene

Scientific classification
- Kingdom: Animalia
- Phylum: Arthropoda
- Class: Insecta
- Order: Coleoptera
- Suborder: Polyphaga
- Infraorder: Cucujiformia
- Family: Cerambycidae
- Genus: Eutetrapha
- Species: †E. nephele

Binomial name
- †Eutetrapha nephele (Heer, 1847)

Synonyms
- Saperda nephele Heer, 1847

Species of beetle

Eutetrapha nephele is an extinct species of beetle in the family Cerambycidae, that existed during the Upper Miocene in what is now Germany. It was described by Heer in 1847.
