= Eutetrapha metallescens =

Scientific classification
- Kingdom: Animalia
- Phylum: Arthropoda
- Class: Insecta
- Order: Coleoptera
- Suborder: Polyphaga
- Infraorder: Cucujiformia
- Family: Cerambycidae
- Genus: Eutetrapha
- Species: E. metallescens

Binomial name
- Eutetrapha metallescens (Motschulsky, 1860)

Synonyms
- Saperda metallescens Motschulsky, 1860

Species of beetle

Eutetrapha metallescens is a species of longhorn beetle in the family Cerambycidae. It was described by Victor Motschulsky in 1860, originally under the genus Saperda.
