= Paraglenea cinereonigra =

Scientific classification
- Domain: Eukaryota
- Kingdom: Animalia
- Phylum: Arthropoda
- Class: Insecta
- Order: Coleoptera
- Suborder: Polyphaga
- Infraorder: Cucujiformia
- Family: Cerambycidae
- Genus: Paraglenea
- Species: P. cinereonigra

Binomial name
- Paraglenea cinereonigra Pesarini & Sabbadini, 1996

Species of beetle

Paraglenea cinereonigra is a species of beetle in the family Cerambycidae. It was described by Pesarini and Sabbadini in 1996. It is known from China.
