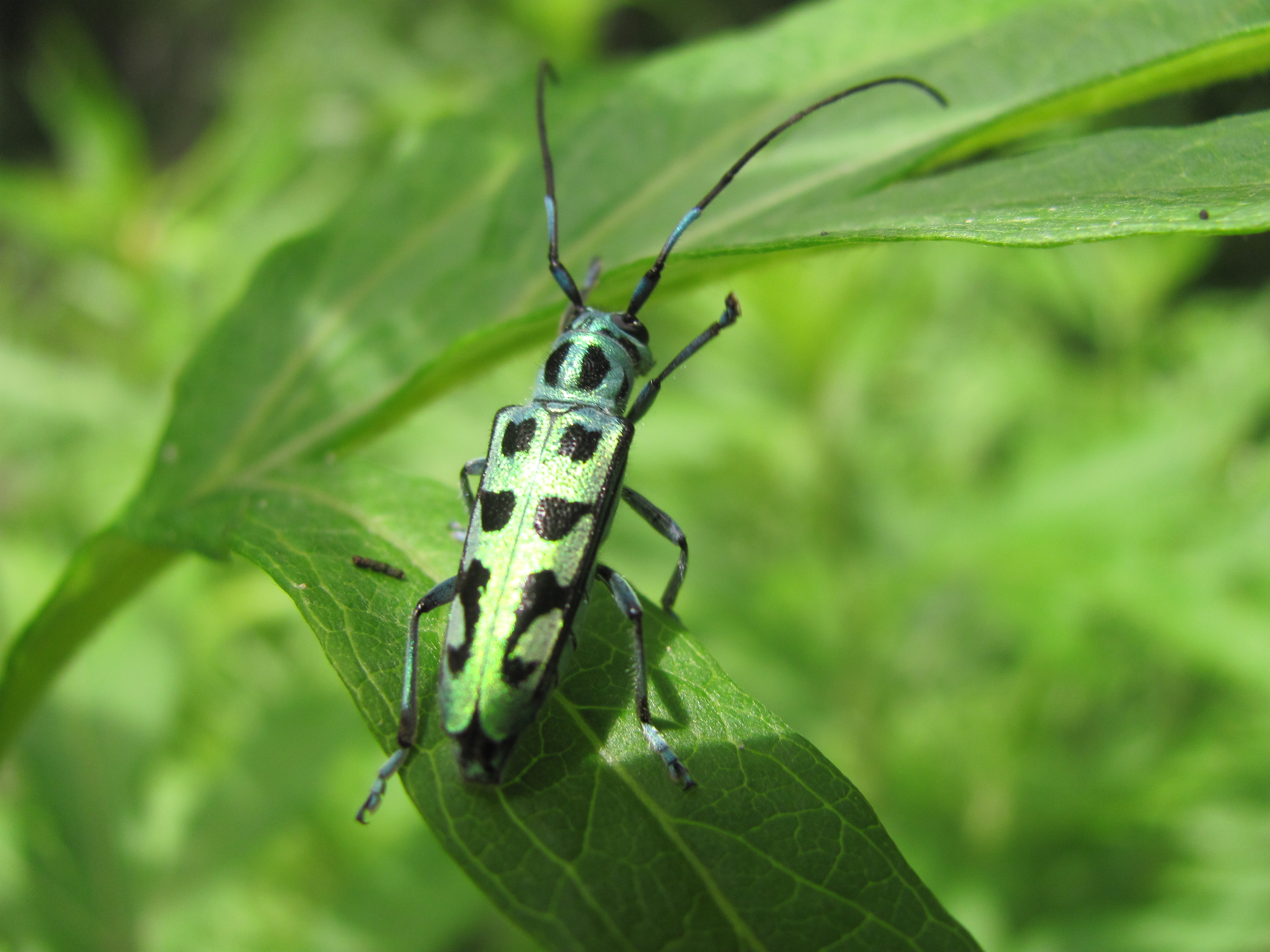
- Eutetrapha chrysochloris

Scientific classification
- Kingdom: Animalia
- Phylum: Arthropoda
- Class: Insecta
- Order: Coleoptera
- Suborder: Polyphaga
- Infraorder: Cucujiformia
- Family: Cerambycidae
- Subfamily: Lamiinae
- Tribe: Saperdini
- Genus: Eutetrapha; Bates, 1884

= Eutetrapha =

Genus of beetles

Eutetrapha is a genus of longhorn beetles of the subfamily Lamiinae, containing the following species:

- Eutetrapha biscostata Hayashi, 1994
- Eutetrapha chrysochloris (Bates, 1879)
- Eutetrapha cinnabarina Pu, 1986
- Eutetrapha elegans Hayashi, 1966
- Eutetrapha laosensis Breuning, 1965
- Eutetrapha lini Chou, Chung & Lin, 2014
- Eutetrapha metallescens (Motschulsky, 1860)
- Eutetrapha nephele (Heer, 1847) †
- Eutetrapha ocelota (Bates, 1873)
- Eutetrapha sedecimpunctata (Motschulsky, 1860)
- Eutetrapha striolata Zhang J. F., 1989 †
- Eutetrapha terenia Zhang J. F., Sun B. & Zhang X., 1994 †
