= Paraglenea atropurpurea =

Scientific classification
- Domain: Eukaryota
- Kingdom: Animalia
- Phylum: Arthropoda
- Class: Insecta
- Order: Coleoptera
- Suborder: Polyphaga
- Infraorder: Cucujiformia
- Family: Cerambycidae
- Genus: Paraglenea
- Species: P. atropurpurea

Binomial name
- Paraglenea atropurpurea Gressitt, 1951

Species of beetle

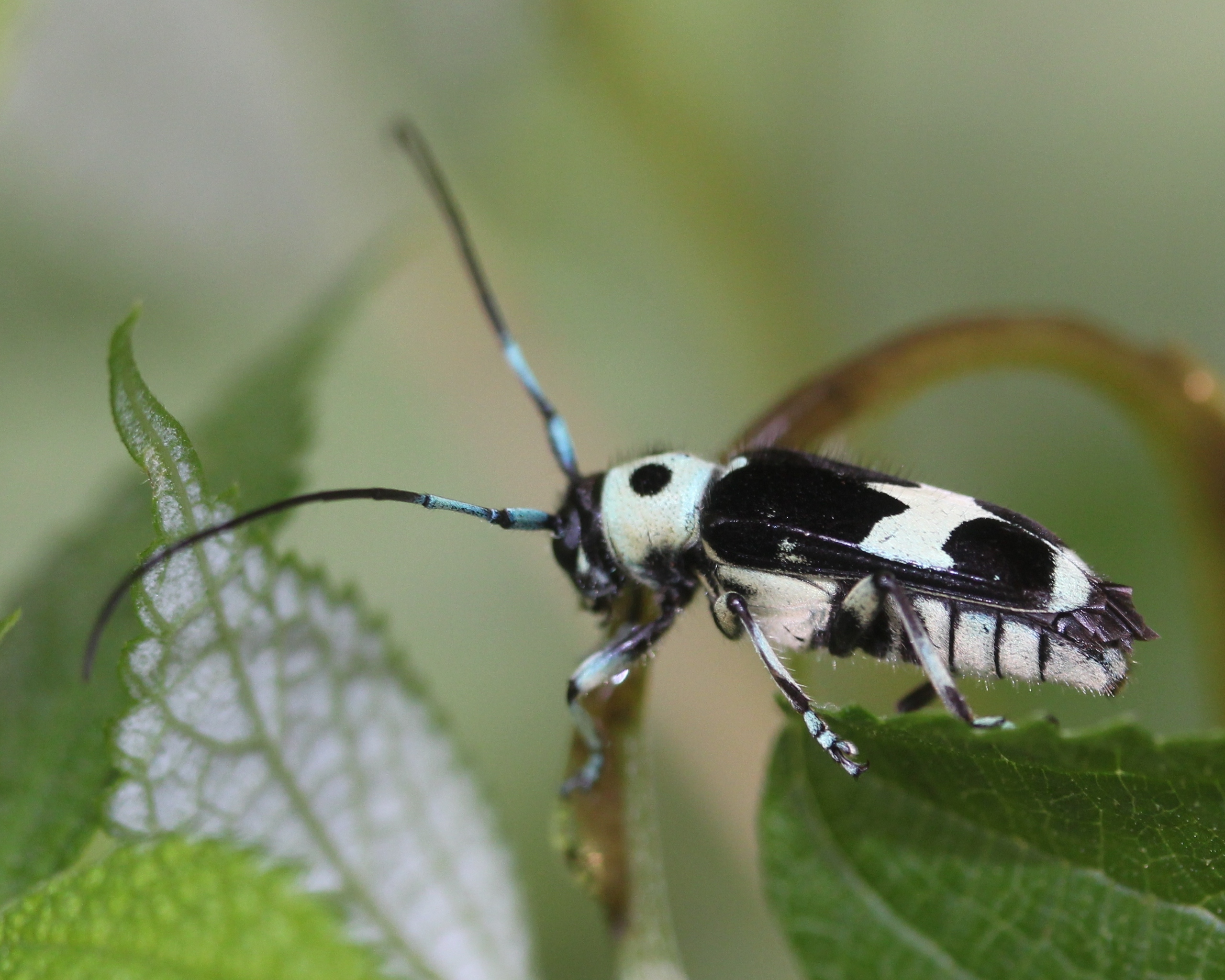
This is a representation of the Paraglenea atropurpurea.

Paraglenea atropurpurea is a species of beetle in the family Cerambycidae. It was described by Gressitt in 1951.
