= Eutetrapha biscostata =

Scientific classification
- Kingdom: Animalia
- Phylum: Arthropoda
- Class: Insecta
- Order: Coleoptera
- Suborder: Polyphaga
- Infraorder: Cucujiformia
- Family: Cerambycidae
- Genus: Eutetrapha
- Species: E. biscostata

Binomial name
- Eutetrapha biscostata Hayashi, 1994

Species of beetle

Eutetrapha biscostata is a species of beetle in the family Cerambycidae. It was described by Masao Hayashi in 1994.
