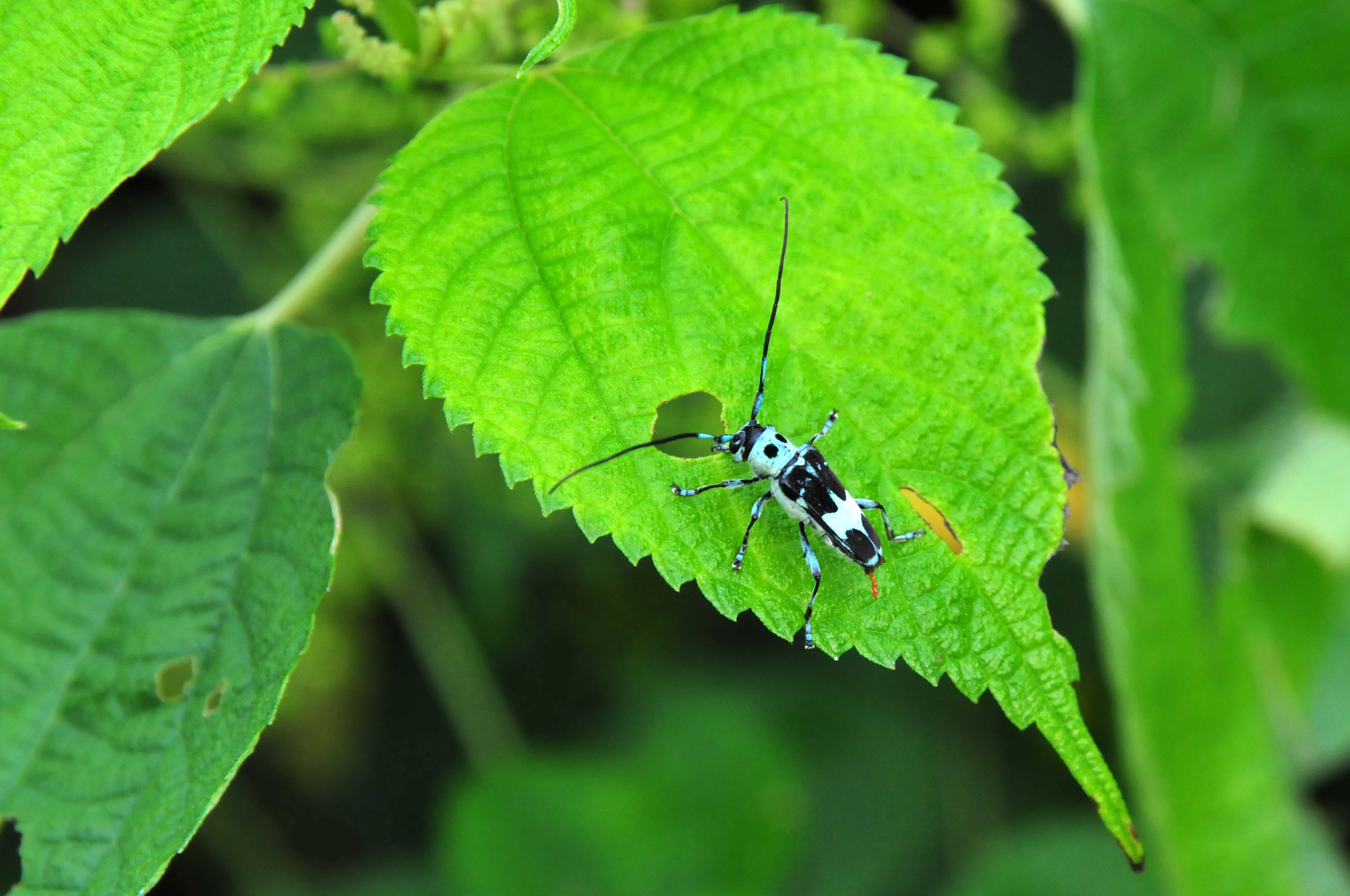
- Paraglenea fortunei

Scientific classification
- Kingdom: Animalia
- Phylum: Arthropoda
- Class: Insecta
- Order: Coleoptera
- Suborder: Polyphaga
- Infraorder: Cucujiformia
- Family: Cerambycidae
- Tribe: Saperdini
- Genus: Paraglenea; Bates, 1866

= Paraglenea =

Genus of beetles

Paraglenea is a genus of Asian longhorn beetles of the subfamily Lamiinae.

== Species ==
BioLib includes the following:

- Paraglenea atropurpurea Gressitt, 1951
- Paraglenea chapaensis Breuning, 1952
- Paraglenea cinereonigra Pesarini & Sabbadini, 1996
- Paraglenea dairanxingorum Lin, You & Wang, 2025
- Paraglenea fortunei (Saunders, 1853)
- Paraglenea latefasciata Breuning, 1952
- Paraglenea swinhoei Bates, 1866
- Paraglenea transversefasciata Breuning, 1952
- Paraglenea velutinofasciata (Pic, 1939)
