= List of Oberea species =

This is a list of 327 species in Oberea, a genus of flat-faced longhorns in the family Cerambycidae.

== Oberea species ==
- Oberea abdominalis Jordan, 1894^{c g}
- Oberea acuta Gressitt, 1951^{c g}
- Oberea adumbrata (Tippmann, 1958)^{c g}
- Oberea affinis Leng & Hamilton, 1896^{i c g b} (raspberry cane borer)
- Oberea alexandrovi Plavilstshikov, 1921
- Oberea andamana Breuning, 1962^{c g}
- Oberea andamanica Breuning, 1962^{c g}
- Oberea angolana Breuning, 1962^{c g}
- Oberea angolensis Breuning, 1950^{c g}
- Oberea anguina Pascoe, 1867^{c g}
- Oberea angustata Pic, 1923^{c g}
- Oberea annamensis Breuning, 1969^{c g}
- Oberea annulicornis Pascoe, 1858^{c g}
- Oberea antennata Franz, 1972^{c g}
- Oberea anterufa Breuning, 1962^{c g}
- Oberea apicenigrita Breuning, 1962^{c g}
- Oberea artocarpi Gardner, 1941^{c g}
- Oberea assamensis Breuning, 1982^{c g}
- Oberea aterrima Breuning, 1962^{c g}
- Oberea atricilla Fairmaire, 1893^{c g}
- Oberea atricilloides Breuning, 1964^{c g}
- Oberea atroantennalis Breuning, 1962^{c g}
- Oberea atropunctata Pic, 1916^{c g}
- Oberea auricollis Aurivillius, 1922^{c g}
- Oberea auriventris Breuning, 1962^{c g}
- Oberea baliana Breuning, 1962^{c g}
- Oberea balineae Heller, 1915^{c g}
- Oberea bangueyensis Breuning, 1950^{c g}
- Oberea baramensis Heyden, 1897^{c g}
- Oberea batoensis Breuning, 1951^{c g}
- Oberea bicallosicollis Pic, 1933^{c g}
- Oberea bicoloricornis Pic, 1915^{c g}
- Oberea bicoloripennis Breuning, 1950^{c g}
- Oberea bimaculata (Olivier, 1795)^{c}
- Oberea bimaculicollis Breuning, 1962^{c g}
- Oberea binotaticollis Pic, 1915^{c g}
- Oberea birmanica Gahan, 1895
- Oberea bisbimaculata Breuning, 1962^{c g}
- Oberea bisbipunctata Pic, 1916^{c g}
- Oberea bisbipunctulata Breuning, 1962^{c g}
- Oberea bivittata Aurivillius, 1911^{c g}
- Oberea bootangensis Breuning, 1962^{c g}
- Oberea breviantennalis Kurihara & N. Ohbayashi, 2006^{c g}
- Oberea brevithorax Gressitt, 1936^{c g}
- Oberea callosicollis Breuning, 1962^{c g}
- Oberea cariniscapus Breuning, 1956^{c g}
- Oberea caseyi Plavilstshikov, 1926^{c g}
- Oberea ceylonica Aurivillius, 1921^{c g}
- Oberea chapaensis Pic, 1928^{c g}
- Oberea cingulata (Aurivillius, 1914)^{c g}
- Oberea circumscutellaris Breuning, 1962^{c g}
- Oberea clara Pascoe, 1866^{c g}
- Oberea compta Pascoe, 1867^{c g}
- Oberea conicus Wang, Chiang & Zheng, 2002^{c g}
- Oberea consentanea Pascoe, 1867^{c g}
- Oberea coxalis Gressitt, 1940^{c g}
- Oberea curialis Pascoe, 1866^{c g}
- Oberea curticollis (Pic, 1928)^{c g}
- Oberea curtilineata Pic, 1915^{c g}
- Oberea davaoensis Breuning, 1962^{c g}
- Oberea deficiens Casey, 1924^{c g b}
- Oberea delongi Knull, 1928^{i c g b} (poplar twig borer)
- Oberea demissa (Newman, 1842)^{c g}
- Oberea denominata Plavilstshikov, 1926^{c g}
- Oberea densepilosa Breuning, 1955^{c g}
- Oberea densepunctata Breuning, 1954^{c g}
- Oberea densepunctipennis Breuning, 1962^{c g}
- Oberea depressa (Gebler, 1825)^{c g}
- Oberea difformis Jordan, 1894^{c g}
- Oberea discoidalis (Jordan, 1894)^{c g}
- Oberea distinctipennis Pic, 1902^{c g}
- Oberea diversimembris Pic, 1923^{c g}
- Oberea donceeli Pic, 1907^{c g}
- Oberea elegantula (Kolbe, 1894)^{c g}
- Oberea elongaticollis Breuning, 1962^{c g}
- Oberea elongatipennis Pic, 1940^{c g}
- Oberea erythrocephala (Schrank, 1776)^{i c g b} (leafy spurge stem boring beetle)
- Oberea erythrostoma Heller, 1915^{c g}
- Oberea euphorbiae (Germar, 1813)^{c g}
- Oberea ferruginea Thunberg, 1787^{c g}
- Oberea flava Breuning, 1962^{c g}
- Oberea flavipennis Kurihara & N. Ohbayashi, 2007^{c g}
- Oberea flavipes Haldeman, 1847^{i c g b}
- Oberea flavoantennalis Breuning, 1962^{c g}
- Oberea flavoantennata Breuning, 1962^{c g}
- Oberea flavodiscalis Breuning, 1982
- Oberea flavotrigonalis Breuning, 1950^{c g}
- Oberea florensis Breuning, 1962^{c g}
- Oberea floresica Breuning, 1962^{c g}
- Oberea formosana Pic, 1911^{c g}
- Oberea formososylvia Kurihara & N. Ohbayashi, 2007^{c g}
- Oberea fulviceps Breuning, 1950^{c g}
- Oberea fuscicollis Breuning, 1962^{c g}
- Oberea fuscipennis (Chevrolat, 1852)^{c g}
- Oberea fusciventris Fairmaire, 1895^{c g}
- Oberea gabunensis Breuning, 1950^{c g}
- Oberea gracilis (Fabricius, 1801)^{i c g b} (oak sprout oberea)
- Oberea gracillima Pascoe, 1867^{c g}
- Oberea griseopennis Schwarzer, 1925
- Oberea grossepunctata Breuning, 1947^{c g}
- Oberea hanoiensis Pic, 1923^{c g}
- Oberea hebescens Bates, 1873^{c g}
- Oberea herzi Ganglbauer, 1887^{c g}
- Oberea heudei Pic, 1936^{c g}
- Oberea heyrovskyi Pic, 1927^{c g}
- Oberea himalayana Breuning, 1971^{c g}
- Oberea histrionis Pic, 1917^{c g}
- Oberea holatripennis Breuning, 1982
- Oberea holatripennoides (Löbl & Smetana, 2010)^{c g}
- Oberea holonigra Breuning, 1962^{c g}
- Oberea humeralis Gressitt, 1939^{c g}
- Oberea humilis (Fairmaire, 1894)^{c g}
- Oberea inclusa Pascoe, 1858^{c g}
- Oberea incompleta Fairmaire, 1897^{c g}
- Oberea infragrisea Breuning, 1978^{c g}
- Oberea infranigra Breuning, 1962^{c g}
- Oberea infranigrescens Breuning, 1947^{c g}
- Oberea infrasericea Breuning, 1951^{c g}
- Oberea insoluta Pascoe, 1867^{c g}
- Oberea insperans Pascoe, 1867^{c g}
- Oberea isigakiana Matsushita, 1941^{c g}
- Oberea japonica (Thunberg, 1787)^{c g}
- Oberea javana Breuning, 1962^{c g}
- Oberea javanicola Breuning, 1950^{c g}
- Oberea jordani Aurivillius, 1923^{c g}
- Oberea kanarensis Breuning, 1950^{c g}
- Oberea kandyana Breuning, 1962^{c g}
- Oberea kangeana Breuning, 1969^{c g}
- Oberea keyensis Breuning, 1962^{c g}
- Oberea komiyai Kurihara & Ohbayashi, 2006
- Oberea kostini Danilevsky, 1988^{c g}
- Oberea kualabokensis Hayashi, 1976^{c g}
- Oberea kunbirensis Breuning, 1953^{c g}
- Oberea lacana Pic, 1923^{c g}
- Oberea laetifica Pascoe, 1867^{c g}
- Oberea lama Gressitt, 1942^{c g}
- Oberea laosensis Breuning, 1963^{c g}
- Oberea lateapicalis Pic, 1939^{c g}
- Oberea latericollis Breuning, 1962^{c g}
- Oberea laterinigricollis Breuning, 1976^{c g}
- Oberea latipenne Gressitt, 1939^{c g}
- Oberea lepesmiana Breuning, 1956^{c g}
- Oberea leucothrix Toyoshima, 1982^{c g}
- Oberea linearis (Linné, 1761)^{c g}
- Oberea longissima Aurivillius, 1907^{c g}
- Oberea luluensis Breuning, 1950^{c g}
- Oberea lutea (Thunberg, 1787)^{c g}
- Oberea lyncea Pascoe, 1867^{c g}
- Oberea macilenta (Newman, 1842)^{c g}
- Oberea maculicollis Lucas, 1842^{c g}
- Oberea mangalorensis Gardner, 1941
- Oberea manipurensis Breuning, 1962^{c g}
- Oberea matangensis Breuning, 1962^{c g}
- Oberea mauritanica Lucas, 1888
- Oberea medioflavoantennalis Breuning, 1962^{c g}
- Oberea mediofusciventris Breuning, 1962^{c g}
- Oberea melanocephala (Aurivillius, 1914)^{c g}
- Oberea melanostoma Heller, 1915^{c g}
- Oberea mentaweiensis Breuning, 1962^{c g}
- Oberea meridionalis Breuning, 1962^{c g}
- Oberea micholitzi Heller, 1915^{c g}
- Oberea mimetica Heller, 1915^{c g}
- Oberea mixta Bates, 1873^{c g}
- Oberea monticola Fisher, 1935^{c g}
- Oberea morio Kraatz, 1879^{c g}
- Oberea morosa Pascoe, 1867^{c g}
- Oberea mundula Pascoe, 1867
- Oberea mutata Pascoe, 1867^{c g}
- Oberea myops Haldeman, 1847^{i c g b} (rhododendron stem borer)
- Oberea neavei (Aurivillius, 1914)^{c g}
- Oberea nefasta Pascoe, 1867^{c g}
- Oberea neptis Pascoe, 1867^{c g}
- Oberea neutralis Pascoe, 1867^{c g}
- Oberea nigerrima Breuning, 1950^{c g}
- Oberea nigrescens Breuning, 1962^{c g}
- Oberea nigriceps (White, 1844)^{c g}
- Oberea nigripennis Breuning, 1950^{c g}
- Oberea nigripes Breuning, 1950^{c g}
- Oberea nigriventris Bates, 1873
- Oberea nigroapiciventris Breuning, 1962^{c g}
- Oberea nigrobasipennis Breuning, 1950^{c g}
- Oberea nigrocincta (Aurivillius, 1907)^{c g}
- Oberea nigrofemoralis Breuning, 1950^{c g}
- Oberea nigrolateralis Breuning, 1950^{c g}
- Oberea nigrolineata (Aurivillius, 1916)^{c g}
- Oberea nigrolineatipennis Breuning, 1970^{c g}
- Oberea nigrotibialis Breuning, 1972^{c g}
- Oberea notata Pic, 1936^{c g}
- Oberea nyassana Breuning, 1956
- Oberea ocellata Haldeman, 1847^{i c g b} (sumac stem borer)
- Oberea octava Schwarzer, 1927^{c g}
- Oberea oculata (Linné, 1758)^{c g}
- Oberea oculaticollis (Say, 1824)^{i c g}
- Oberea ohbayashii Kurihara, 2009^{c g}
- Oberea okinawana Kusakabe, 1992^{c g}
- Oberea opaca Gahan, 1907^{c g}
- Oberea opacipennis Breuning, 1962^{c g}
- Oberea ophidiana Pascoe, 1858^{c g}
- Oberea ornativentris Breuning, 1962^{c g}
- Oberea orothi Breuning, 1962^{c g}
- Oberea pagana Harold, 1880^{c g}
- Oberea palawanensis Breuning, 1962^{c g}
- Oberea pallida Casey, 1913^{c g}
- Oberea pallidula Gerstäcker, 1855
- Oberea paraneavei Breuning, 1976^{c g}
- Oberea pararubetra Breuning, 1965^{c g}
- Oberea parteflavoantennalis Breuning, 1962^{c g}
- Oberea partenigricollis Breuning, 1962^{c g}
- Oberea pedemontana Chevrolat, 1856^{c g}
- Oberea perspicillata Haldeman, 1847^{i c g b} (raspberry cane borer)
- Oberea philippinensis Breuning, 1962^{c g}
- Oberea phungi Breuning, 1967^{c g}
- Oberea pictipes Pascoe, 1867^{c g}
- Oberea pigra (Newman, 1851)^{c g}
- Oberea pontianakensis Breuning, 1962^{c g}
- Oberea postbrunnea Breuning, 1977^{c g}
- Oberea posticata Gahan, 1895
- Oberea praedita Pascoe, 1867^{c g}
- Oberea praelonga Casey, 1913^{i c g b}
- Oberea praemortua Heyden, 1862 †
- Oberea prateflavoantennalis Breuning, 1961
- Oberea protensa Pascoe, 1867^{c g}
- Oberea pruinosa Casey, 1913^{c g b}
- Oberea pseudannulicornis Breuning, 1982^{c g}
- Oberea pseudobalineae Breuning, 1955^{c g}
- Oberea pseudolacana Breuning, 1956^{c g}
- Oberea pseudoneavei Breuning, 1976^{c g}
- Oberea pseudonigrocincta Breuning, 1962^{c g}
- Oberea pseudopascoei Breuning, 1950^{c g}
- Oberea pseudopictipes Breuning, 1962^{c g}
- Oberea pseudoposticata Breuning, 1962^{c g}
- Oberea pseudovaricornis Hunt & Breuning, 1956^{c g}
- Oberea puncticollis Breuning, 1962^{c g}
- Oberea punctiventris Heller, 1915^{c g}
- Oberea pupillata (Gyllenhal, 1817)^{c g}
- Oberea quadricallosa LeConte, 1874^{i c g b} (western poplar branch borer)
- Oberea quianga Heller, 1915^{c g}
- Oberea reductesignata Pic, 1916^{c g}
- Oberea reimschi Breuning, 1962^{c g}
- Oberea ressli Demelt, 1963^{c g}
- Oberea rhodesica Breuning, 1953^{c g}
- Oberea rondoni Breuning, 1965^{c g}
- Oberea rotundipennis Breuning, 1956^{c g}
- Oberea rubetra Pascoe, 1858^{c g}
- Oberea ruficeps Fischer, 1842^{c g}
- Oberea ruficollis (Fabricius, 1792)^{i c g b} (sassafras borer)
- Oberea ruficornis Breuning, 1956^{c g}
- Oberea rufiniventris Breuning, 1968^{c g}
- Oberea rufiventris Aurivillius, 1914^{c g}
- Oberea rufoantennalis Breuning, 1962^{c g}
- Oberea rufomaculata Kono & Tamanuki, 1924
- Oberea rufosternalis Breuning, 1962^{c g}
- Oberea rufotrigonalis Breuning, 1950^{c g}
- Oberea sanghirica Breuning, 1962^{c g}
- Oberea sanguinalis (Kolbe, 1893)^{c g}
- Oberea sansibarica Harold, 1880^{c g}
- Oberea satoi Kurihara, 2009^{c g}
- Oberea savioi Pic, 1924
- Oberea schaumi LeConte, 1852^{i}
- Oberea schaumii LeConte, 1852^{c g b} (poplar branch borer)
- Oberea scutellaris Gerstäcker, 1855
- Oberea scutellaroides Breuning, 1947^{c g}
- Oberea semifusca Breuning, 1962^{c g}
- Oberea semifuscipennis Breuning, 1950^{c g}
- Oberea semimaura Pascoe, 1867^{c g}
- Oberea seminigra Chevrolat, 1841^{c g}
- Oberea semiorbifera (Aurivillius, 1914)^{c g}
- Oberea semirubra Breuning, 1962^{c g}
- Oberea senegalensis Breuning, 1962^{c g}
- Oberea sericeiventris Breuning, 1950^{c g}
- Oberea shibatai Hayashi, 1962^{c g}
- Oberea shimomurai Kurihara & N. Ohbayashi, 2007^{c g}
- Oberea shirahatai Ohbayashi, 1956^{c g}
- Oberea shirakii Hayashi, 1963^{c g}
- Oberea silhetica Breuning, 1962^{c g}
- Oberea sinense Pic, 1902^{c g}
- Oberea sobosana Ohbayashi, 1956^{c g}
- Oberea sobrina (Boisduval, 1835)^{c g}
- Oberea strigicollis Gressitt, 1942^{c g}
- Oberea subabdominalis Breuning, 1962^{c g}
- Oberea subannulicornis Pic, 1916
- Oberea subbasalis Breuning, 1950^{c g}
- Oberea subdiscoidalis Lepesme & Breuning, 1952^{c g}
- Oberea subelongatipennis Breuning, 1955^{c g}
- Oberea subferruginea Breuning, 1965^{c g}
- Oberea subneavei Breuning, 1962^{c g}
- Oberea subnigrocincta Breuning, 1950^{c g}
- Oberea subsericea Breuning, 1962^{c g}
- Oberea subsuturalis Breuning, 1954^{c g}
- Oberea subtenuata Breuning, 1968^{c g}
- Oberea subteraurea Breuning, 1962^{c g}
- Oberea subtrigonifera Breuning, 1958^{c g}
- Oberea subvaricornis Breuning, 1962^{c g}
- Oberea subviperina Breuning, 1960^{c g}
- Oberea sumbana Breuning, 1962^{c g}
- Oberea sumbawana Breuning, 1962^{c g}
- Oberea sumbawanica Breuning, 1962^{c g}
- Oberea sumbawensis Breuning, 1962^{c g}
- Oberea taihokensis Breuning, 1961^{g}
- Oberea taihokuensis Breuning, 1962^{c g}
- Oberea taiwana Matsushita, 1933^{c g}
- Oberea tatsienlui Breuning, 1947^{c g}
- Oberea taygetana Pic, 1901^{c g}
- Oberea tenggeriana Breuning, 1963^{c g}
- Oberea tenuata Pascoe, 1866^{c g}
- Oberea tetrastigma Gressitt, 1951
- Oberea travancorensis Breuning, 1962^{c g}
- Oberea tricolor Aurivillius, 1924^{c g}
- Oberea tricoloricornis Breuning, 1961^{c g}
- Oberea trigonalis Breuning, 1950^{c g}
- Oberea trilineata (Chevrolat, 1858)^{c g}
- Oberea tripunctata (Swederus, 1787)^{i c g b} (dogwood twig borer)
- Oberea truncatipennis Breuning, 1962^{c g}
- Oberea tsuyukii Kurihara & N. Ohbayashi, 2007^{c g}
- Oberea ulmicola Chittenden, 1904^{c g}
- Oberea umebayashii Ohbayashi, 1964^{c g}
- Oberea unimaculicollis Breuning, 1962^{c g}
- Oberea uninotaticollis Pic, 1939^{c g}
- Oberea unipunctata Gressitt, 1939
- Oberea viperina Pascoe, 1858^{c g}
- Oberea vittata Blessig, 1873
- Oberea walkeri Gahan, 1894^{c g}
- Oberea wittei Breuning, 1954^{c g}
- Oberea yaoshana Gressitt, 1942^{c g}
- Oberea yasuhikoi Kusakabe, 2001^{c g}
- Oberea yunnana Pic, 1926^{c g}
- Oberea yunnanensis Breuning, 1947^{c g}

Data sources: i = ITIS, c = Catalogue of Life, g = GBIF, b = Bugguide.net
