= Oberea seminigra =

Scientific classification
- Domain: Eukaryota
- Kingdom: Animalia
- Phylum: Arthropoda
- Class: Insecta
- Order: Coleoptera
- Suborder: Polyphaga
- Infraorder: Cucujiformia
- Family: Cerambycidae
- Genus: Oberea
- Species: O. seminigra

Binomial name
- Oberea seminigra Chevrolat, 1841

Species of beetle

Oberea seminigra is a species of beetle in the family Cerambycidae. It was described by Chevrolat in 1841. It is known from the Philippines. It contains the varietas Oberea seminigra var. clareabdominalis.
