= Oberea nigrocincta =

Scientific classification
- Domain: Eukaryota
- Kingdom: Animalia
- Phylum: Arthropoda
- Class: Insecta
- Order: Coleoptera
- Suborder: Polyphaga
- Infraorder: Cucujiformia
- Family: Cerambycidae
- Genus: Oberea
- Species: O. nigrocincta

Binomial name
- Oberea nigrocincta Aurivillius, 1907

Species of beetle

Oberea nigrocincta is a species of beetle in the family Cerambycidae. It was described by Per Olof Christopher Aurivillius in 1907.

== Subspecies ==
- Oberea nigrocincta nigrocincta Aurivillius, 1907
- Oberea nigrocincta atroantennata Breuning, 1976
