= Oberea scutellaris =

Scientific classification
- Domain: Eukaryota
- Kingdom: Animalia
- Phylum: Arthropoda
- Class: Insecta
- Order: Coleoptera
- Suborder: Polyphaga
- Infraorder: Cucujiformia
- Family: Cerambycidae
- Genus: Oberea
- Species: O. scutellaris

Binomial name
- Oberea scutellaris Gerstaecker, 1855

Synonyms
- Oberea melanocera Harold, 1897

Species of beetle

Oberea scutellaris is a species of beetle in the family Cerambycidae. It was described by Carl Eduard Adolph Gerstaecker in 1855.
