= Oberea ressli =

Scientific classification
- Domain: Eukaryota
- Kingdom: Animalia
- Phylum: Arthropoda
- Class: Insecta
- Order: Coleoptera
- Suborder: Polyphaga
- Infraorder: Cucujiformia
- Family: Cerambycidae
- Genus: Oberea
- Species: O. ressli

Binomial name
- Oberea ressli Demelt, 1963

Species of beetle

Oberea ressli is a species of beetle in the family Cerambycidae. It was described by Demelt in 1963. It is known from Turkey.
