= Oberea sinense =

Scientific classification
- Kingdom: Animalia
- Phylum: Arthropoda
- Class: Insecta
- Order: Coleoptera
- Suborder: Polyphaga
- Infraorder: Cucujiformia
- Family: Cerambycidae
- Genus: Oberea
- Species: O. sinense

Binomial name
- Oberea sinense Pic, 1902

Species of beetle

Oberea sinense is a species of beetle in the family Cerambycidae. It was described by Maurice Pic in 1902.
