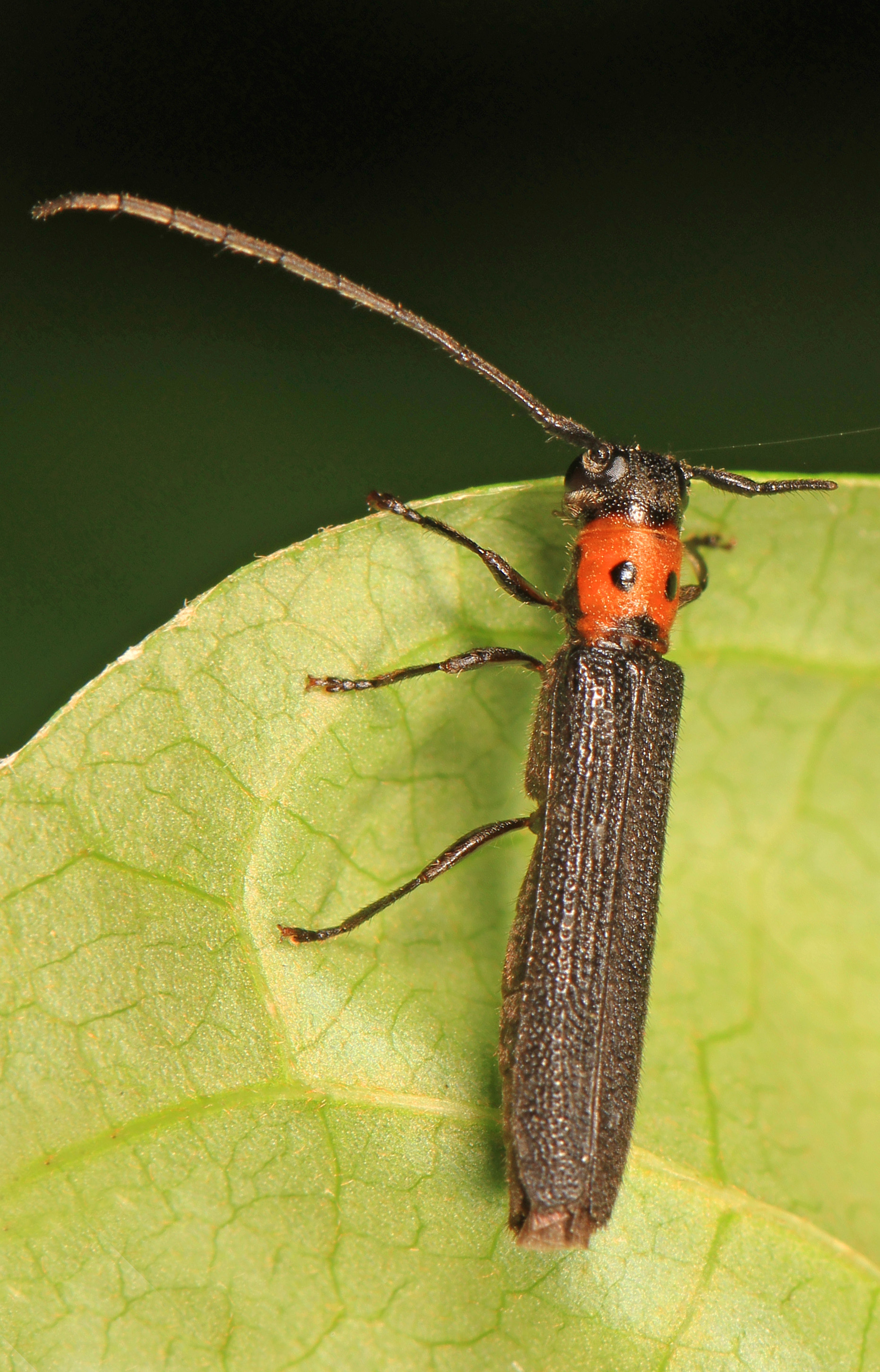

Scientific classification
- Domain: Eukaryota
- Kingdom: Animalia
- Phylum: Arthropoda
- Class: Insecta
- Order: Coleoptera
- Suborder: Polyphaga
- Infraorder: Cucujiformia
- Family: Cerambycidae
- Genus: Oberea
- Species: O. perspicillata

Binomial name
- Oberea perspicillata Haldeman, 1847

Synonyms
- Oberea basalis LeConte, 1852; Oberea bipunctata Creutzer, 1896; Oberea delicatula Casey, 1913; Oberea dolosa Casey, 1913; Oberea exilis Casey, 1913; Oberea filum Casey, 1913; Oberea flavocephala Blatchley, 1922; Oberea insignis Casey, 1913; Oberea iowensis Casey, 1913; Oberea montana Casey, 1913; Oberea texana Horn, 1878; Oberea umbra Casey, 1913

= Oberea perspicillata =

Species of beetle

Oberea perspicillata, the raspberry cane borer, is a species of flat-faced longhorn in the beetle family Cerambycidae. It is found in North America.
