= Oberea formosana =

Scientific classification
- Kingdom: Animalia
- Phylum: Arthropoda
- Class: Insecta
- Order: Coleoptera
- Suborder: Polyphaga
- Infraorder: Cucujiformia
- Family: Cerambycidae
- Genus: Oberea
- Species: O. formosana

Binomial name
- Oberea formosana Pic, 1911

Species of beetle

Oberea formosana is a species of longhorn beetle in the genus Oberea, discovered by Pic in 1911.
