= Oberea komiyai =

Scientific classification
- Domain: Eukaryota
- Kingdom: Animalia
- Phylum: Arthropoda
- Class: Insecta
- Order: Coleoptera
- Suborder: Polyphaga
- Infraorder: Cucujiformia
- Family: Cerambycidae
- Genus: Oberea
- Species: O. komiyai

Binomial name
- Oberea komiyai Kurihara & Ohbayashi, 2006

Species of beetle

Oberea komiyai is a species of beetle in the family Cerambycidae. It was described by Kurihara and Ohbayashi in 2006.
