= Oberea semimaura =

Scientific classification
- Domain: Eukaryota
- Kingdom: Animalia
- Phylum: Arthropoda
- Class: Insecta
- Order: Coleoptera
- Suborder: Polyphaga
- Infraorder: Cucujiformia
- Family: Cerambycidae
- Genus: Oberea
- Species: O. semimaura

Binomial name
- Oberea semimaura Pascoe, 1867

Species of beetle

Oberea semimaura is a species of beetle in the family Cerambycidae. It was described by Francis Polkinghorne Pascoe in 1867.
