= Oberea praedita =

Scientific classification
- Kingdom: Animalia
- Phylum: Arthropoda
- Class: Insecta
- Order: Coleoptera
- Suborder: Polyphaga
- Infraorder: Cucujiformia
- Family: Cerambycidae
- Genus: Oberea
- Species: O. praedita

Binomial name
- Oberea praedita Pascoe, 1867

Synonyms
- Oberea antenigripes Breuning, 1961

Species of beetle

Oberea praedita is a species of beetle in the family Cerambycidae. It was described by Francis Polkinghorne Pascoe in 1867. It is known from Borneo.
