= Oberea pruinosa =

Scientific classification
- Kingdom: Animalia
- Phylum: Arthropoda
- Class: Insecta
- Order: Coleoptera
- Suborder: Polyphaga
- Infraorder: Cucujiformia
- Family: Cerambycidae
- Genus: Oberea
- Species: O. pruinosa

Binomial name
- Oberea pruinosa Casey, 1913

Species of beetle

Oberea pruinosa is a species of beetle in the family Cerambycidae. It was described by Thomas Lincoln Casey Jr. in 1913. It is native to North America.
