= Oberea umebayashii =

Scientific classification
- Domain: Eukaryota
- Kingdom: Animalia
- Phylum: Arthropoda
- Class: Insecta
- Order: Coleoptera
- Suborder: Polyphaga
- Infraorder: Cucujiformia
- Family: Cerambycidae
- Genus: Oberea
- Species: O. umebayashii

Binomial name
- Oberea umebayashii Ohbayashi, 1964

Species of beetle

Oberea umebayashii is a species of beetle in the family Cerambycidae. It was described by Ohbayashi in 1964. It is known from Japan.
