= Oberea laetifica =

Scientific classification
- Domain: Eukaryota
- Kingdom: Animalia
- Phylum: Arthropoda
- Class: Insecta
- Order: Coleoptera
- Suborder: Polyphaga
- Infraorder: Cucujiformia
- Family: Cerambycidae
- Genus: Oberea
- Species: O. laetifica

Binomial name
- Oberea laetifica Pascoe, 1867

Species of beetle

Oberea laetifica is a species of beetle in the family Cerambycidae. It was described by Francis Polkinghorne Pascoe in 1867.
