= Oberea okinawana =

Scientific classification
- Domain: Eukaryota
- Kingdom: Animalia
- Phylum: Arthropoda
- Class: Insecta
- Order: Coleoptera
- Suborder: Polyphaga
- Infraorder: Cucujiformia
- Family: Cerambycidae
- Genus: Oberea
- Species: O. okinawana

Binomial name
- Oberea okinawana Kasukabe, 1992

Species of beetle

Oberea okinawana is a species of beetle in the family Cerambycidae. It was described by Kasukabe in 1992.
