= Oberea flavipes =

Scientific classification
- Domain: Eukaryota
- Kingdom: Animalia
- Phylum: Arthropoda
- Class: Insecta
- Order: Coleoptera
- Suborder: Polyphaga
- Infraorder: Cucujiformia
- Family: Cerambycidae
- Genus: Oberea
- Species: O. flavipes

Binomial name
- Oberea flavipes Haldeman, 1847

Species of beetle

Oberea flavipes is a species of beetle in the family Cerambycidae. It was described by Haldeman in 1847. It is known from North America.
