= Oberea quianga =

Scientific classification
- Domain: Eukaryota
- Kingdom: Animalia
- Phylum: Arthropoda
- Class: Insecta
- Order: Coleoptera
- Suborder: Polyphaga
- Infraorder: Cucujiformia
- Family: Cerambycidae
- Genus: Oberea
- Species: O. quianga

Binomial name
- Oberea quianga Heller, 1915

Synonyms
- Oberea quianga m. partefuscicollis Breuning, 1961

Species of beetle

Oberea quianga is a species of beetle in the family Cerambycidae. It was described by Heller in 1915. It is known from the Philippines.
