= Oberea octava =

Scientific classification
- Domain: Eukaryota
- Kingdom: Animalia
- Phylum: Arthropoda
- Class: Insecta
- Order: Coleoptera
- Suborder: Polyphaga
- Infraorder: Cucujiformia
- Family: Cerambycidae
- Genus: Oberea
- Species: O. octava

Binomial name
- Oberea octava Schwarzer, 1927

Species of beetle

Oberea octava is a species of beetle in the family Cerambycidae. It was described by Bernhard Schwarzer in 1927.

== Subspecies ==
- Oberea octava octava Schwarzer, 1927
- Oberea octava kuchingensis Breuning, 1962
