= Oberea lutea =

Scientific classification
- Kingdom: Animalia
- Phylum: Arthropoda
- Clade: Pancrustacea
- Class: Insecta
- Order: Coleoptera
- Suborder: Polyphaga
- Infraorder: Cucujiformia
- Family: Cerambycidae
- Genus: Oberea
- Species: O. lutea

Binomial name
- Oberea lutea Thunberg, 1787

Species of beetle

Oberea lutea is a species of beetle in the family Cerambycidae. It was described by Thunberg in 1787.
