= Oberea pictipes =

Scientific classification
- Kingdom: Animalia
- Phylum: Arthropoda
- Class: Insecta
- Order: Coleoptera
- Suborder: Polyphaga
- Infraorder: Cucujiformia
- Family: Cerambycidae
- Genus: Oberea
- Species: O. pictipes

Binomial name
- Oberea pictipes Pascoe, 1867

Synonyms
- Oberea rubripes Breuning, 1961; Oberea nigrofemorata Breuning, 1956; Oberea tenasserimensis Breuning, 1961

Species of beetle

Oberea pictipes is a species of beetle in the family Cerambycidae. It was described by Francis Polkinghorne Pascoe in 1867. It is known from Borneo.
