= Oberea savioi =

Scientific classification
- Kingdom: Animalia
- Phylum: Arthropoda
- Class: Insecta
- Order: Coleoptera
- Suborder: Polyphaga
- Infraorder: Cucujiformia
- Family: Cerambycidae
- Genus: Oberea
- Species: O. savioi

Binomial name
- Oberea savioi Pic, 1924

Species of beetle

Oberea savioi is a species of beetle in the family Cerambycidae. It was described by Maurice Pic in 1924.
