= Oberea quadricallosa =

Scientific classification
- Kingdom: Animalia
- Phylum: Arthropoda
- Class: Insecta
- Order: Coleoptera
- Suborder: Polyphaga
- Infraorder: Cucujiformia
- Family: Cerambycidae
- Genus: Oberea
- Species: O. quadricallosa

Binomial name
- Oberea quadricallosa LeConte, 1874

Synonyms
- Oberea schaumi var. infrarufa Breuning, 1962

Species of beetle

Oberea quadricallosa is a species of beetle in the family Cerambycidae. It was described by John Lawrence LeConte in 1874. It is known from British Columbia, Canada; and the United States.
