= Oberea yaoshana =

Scientific classification
- Domain: Eukaryota
- Kingdom: Animalia
- Phylum: Arthropoda
- Class: Insecta
- Order: Coleoptera
- Suborder: Polyphaga
- Infraorder: Cucujiformia
- Family: Cerambycidae
- Genus: Oberea
- Species: O. yaoshana

Binomial name
- Oberea yaoshana Gressitt, 1942

Species of beetle

Oberea yaoshana is a species of beetle in the family Cerambycidae. It was described by Gressitt in 1942. It is known from China.
