= Oberea denominata =

Scientific classification
- Kingdom: Animalia
- Phylum: Arthropoda
- Class: Insecta
- Order: Coleoptera
- Suborder: Polyphaga
- Infraorder: Cucujiformia
- Family: Cerambycidae
- Genus: Oberea
- Species: O. denominata

Binomial name
- Oberea denominata Plavilstshikov, 1926

Synonyms
- Oberea limbata Pascoe, 1867

Species of beetle

Oberea denominata is a species of beetle in the family Cerambycidae. It was described by Nikolay Nikolaevich Plavilstshchikov in 1926. It is known from Borneo.
