= Oberea longissima =

Scientific classification
- Domain: Eukaryota
- Kingdom: Animalia
- Phylum: Arthropoda
- Class: Insecta
- Order: Coleoptera
- Suborder: Polyphaga
- Infraorder: Cucujiformia
- Family: Cerambycidae
- Genus: Oberea
- Species: O. longissima

Binomial name
- Oberea longissima Aurivillius, 1907

Synonyms
- Oberea Lepesmei Breuning, 1956; Oberea longissima v. basirufa Breuning, 1962; Oberea lepesmei v. haemorrhoidalis Breuning, 1962

Species of beetle

Oberea longissima is a species of beetle in the family Cerambycidae.
