= Oberea sobrina =

Scientific classification
- Domain: Eukaryota
- Kingdom: Animalia
- Phylum: Arthropoda
- Class: Insecta
- Order: Coleoptera
- Suborder: Polyphaga
- Infraorder: Cucujiformia
- Family: Cerambycidae
- Genus: Oberea
- Species: O. sobrina

Binomial name
- Oberea sobrina Boisduval, 1835

Synonyms
- Oberea institoria Pascoe, 1867

Species of beetle

Oberea sobrina is a species of beetle in the family Cerambycidae. It was described by Jean Baptiste Boisduval in 1835.
