= Oberea shirakii =

Scientific classification
- Kingdom: Animalia
- Phylum: Arthropoda
- Class: Insecta
- Order: Coleoptera
- Suborder: Polyphaga
- Infraorder: Cucujiformia
- Family: Cerambycidae
- Genus: Oberea
- Species: O. shirakii

Binomial name
- Oberea shirakii Hayashi, 1963

Species of beetle

Oberea shirakii is a species of beetle in the family Cerambycidae. It was described by Masao Hayashi in 1963.
