= Oberea shibatai =

Scientific classification
- Kingdom: Animalia
- Phylum: Arthropoda
- Class: Insecta
- Order: Coleoptera
- Suborder: Polyphaga
- Infraorder: Cucujiformia
- Family: Cerambycidae
- Genus: Oberea
- Species: O. shibatai

Binomial name
- Oberea shibatai Hayashi, 1962

Species of beetle

Oberea shibatai is a species of beetle in the family Cerambycidae. It was described by Masao Hayashi in 1962.
