= Oberea conicus =

Scientific classification
- Domain: Eukaryota
- Kingdom: Animalia
- Phylum: Arthropoda
- Class: Insecta
- Order: Coleoptera
- Suborder: Polyphaga
- Infraorder: Cucujiformia
- Family: Cerambycidae
- Genus: Oberea
- Species: O. conicus

Binomial name
- Oberea conicus Wang, Jiang & Zheng, 2002

Synonyms
- Oberea conica Wang, Jiang & Zheng, 2002

Species of beetle

Oberea conicus is a species of beetle in the family Cerambycidae. It was described by Wang, Jiang and Zheng in 2002. It is known from Laos.
