= Oberea mutata =

Scientific classification
- Kingdom: Animalia
- Phylum: Arthropoda
- Clade: Pancrustacea
- Class: Insecta
- Order: Coleoptera
- Suborder: Polyphaga
- Infraorder: Cucujiformia
- Family: Cerambycidae
- Genus: Oberea
- Species: O. mutata

Binomial name
- Oberea mutata Pascoe, 1867

Synonyms
- Oberea acicularis Pascoe, 1867; Oberea longulipennis Fairmaire, 1895

Species of beetle

Oberea mutata is a species of beetle in the family Cerambycidae. It was described by Francis Polkinghorne Pascoe in 1867. It is known from Sumatra and Borneo.
