= Oberea hanoiensis =

Scientific classification
- Kingdom: Animalia
- Phylum: Arthropoda
- Class: Insecta
- Order: Coleoptera
- Suborder: Polyphaga
- Infraorder: Cucujiformia
- Family: Cerambycidae
- Genus: Oberea
- Species: O. hanoiensis

Binomial name
- Oberea hanoiensis Pic, 1923

Species of beetle

Oberea hanoiensis is a species of beetle in the family Cerambycidae. It was described by Maurice Pic in 1923.
