= Oberea senegalensis =

Scientific classification
- Kingdom: Animalia
- Phylum: Arthropoda
- Class: Insecta
- Order: Coleoptera
- Suborder: Polyphaga
- Infraorder: Cucujiformia
- Family: Cerambycidae
- Genus: Oberea
- Species: O. senegalensis

Binomial name
- Oberea senegalensis Breuning, 1961

Species of beetle

Oberea senegalensis is a species of beetle in the family Cerambycidae. It was described by Austrian entomologist Stephan von Breuning in 1961.

== Distribution and habitat ==
Like other species of its genus, it inhabit wooded areas or herbaceous vegetation, particularly near dead or decaying trees.
