= Oberea griseopennis =

Scientific classification
- Domain: Eukaryota
- Kingdom: Animalia
- Phylum: Arthropoda
- Class: Insecta
- Order: Coleoptera
- Suborder: Polyphaga
- Infraorder: Cucujiformia
- Family: Cerambycidae
- Genus: Oberea
- Species: O. griseopennis

Binomial name
- Oberea griseopennis Schwarzer, 1925

Species of beetle

Oberea griseopennis is a species of beetle in the family Cerambycidae. It was described by Bernhard Schwarzer in 1925. It feeds on Cinnamomum camphora.

== Subspecies ==
- Oberea griseopennis ichangensis Breuning, 1969
- Oberea griseopennis chinensis Breuning, 1982
- Oberea griseopennis griseopennis Schwarzer, 1925
