= Oberea ophidiana =

Scientific classification
- Kingdom: Animalia
- Phylum: Arthropoda
- Class: Insecta
- Order: Coleoptera
- Suborder: Polyphaga
- Infraorder: Cucujiformia
- Family: Cerambycidae
- Genus: Oberea
- Species: O. ophidiana

Binomial name
- Oberea ophidiana Pascoe, 1858

Synonyms
- Oberea flavoterminata Heller, 1915

Species of beetle

Oberea ophidiana is a species of beetle in the family Cerambycidae. It was described by Francis Polkinghorne Pascoe in 1858. It is known from the Philippines and Borneo.
