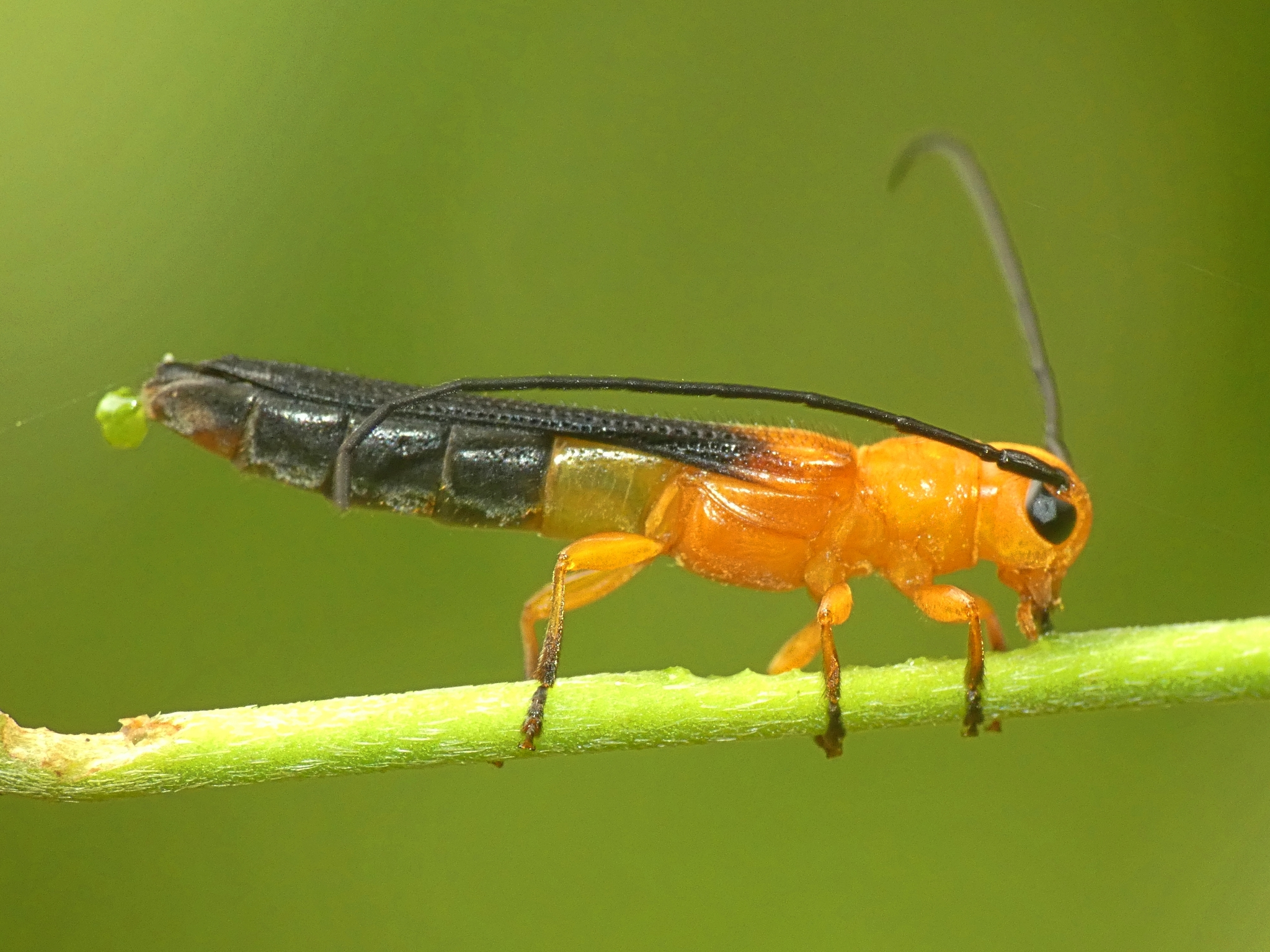

Scientific classification
- Kingdom: Animalia
- Phylum: Arthropoda
- Clade: Pancrustacea
- Class: Insecta
- Order: Coleoptera
- Suborder: Polyphaga
- Infraorder: Cucujiformia
- Family: Cerambycidae
- Genus: Oberea
- Species: O. nefasta

Binomial name
- Oberea nefasta Pascoe, 1867

= Oberea nefasta =

Species of beetle

Oberea nefasta is a species of beetle in the family Cerambycidae. It was first described by Francis Polkinghorne Pascoe in 1867.
