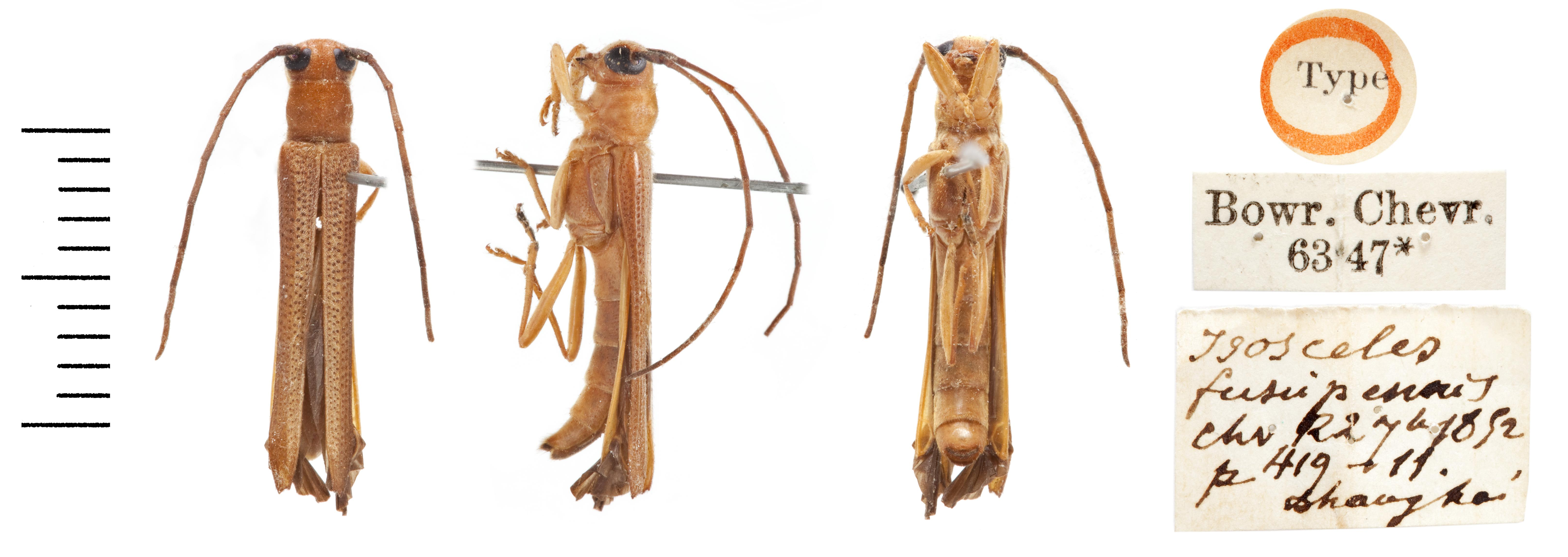

Scientific classification
- Domain: Eukaryota
- Kingdom: Animalia
- Phylum: Arthropoda
- Class: Insecta
- Order: Coleoptera
- Suborder: Polyphaga
- Infraorder: Cucujiformia
- Family: Cerambycidae
- Genus: Oberea
- Species: O. fuscipennis

Binomial name
- Oberea fuscipennis (Chevrolat, 1852)

= Oberea fuscipennis =

Species of beetle

Oberea fuscipennis is a species of beetle in the family Cerambycidae. It was described by Chevrolat in 1852.

== Subspecies ==
- Oberea fuscipennis fuscipennis Chevrolat, 1852
- Oberea fuscipennis fairmairei Aurivillius, 1921
- Oberea fuscipennis perakensis Breuning, 1961
- Oberea fuscipennis infratestacea Pic, 1936
