= Oberea taiwana =

Scientific classification
- Kingdom: Animalia
- Phylum: Arthropoda
- Class: Insecta
- Order: Coleoptera
- Suborder: Polyphaga
- Infraorder: Cucujiformia
- Family: Cerambycidae
- Genus: Oberea
- Species: O. taiwana

Binomial name
- Oberea taiwana Matsushita, 1933

Synonyms
- Oberea taihokuensis Breuning, 1961; Oberea taihokuensis var. flavosternalis Breuning, 1962

Species of beetle

Oberea taiwana is a species of beetle in the family Cerambycidae. It was described by Masaki Matsushita in 1933. It is known from Taiwan.
