= Oberea pigra =

Scientific classification
- Domain: Eukaryota
- Kingdom: Animalia
- Phylum: Arthropoda
- Class: Insecta
- Order: Coleoptera
- Suborder: Polyphaga
- Infraorder: Cucujiformia
- Family: Cerambycidae
- Genus: Oberea
- Species: O. pigra

Binomial name
- Oberea pigra (Newman, 1851)

Species of beetle

Oberea pigra is a species of beetle in the family Cerambycidae. It was described by Newman in 1851. It is known from Australia.
