= Oberea acuta =

Scientific classification
- Domain: Eukaryota
- Kingdom: Animalia
- Phylum: Arthropoda
- Class: Insecta
- Order: Coleoptera
- Suborder: Polyphaga
- Infraorder: Cucujiformia
- Family: Cerambycidae
- Genus: Oberea
- Species: O. acuta

Binomial name
- Oberea acuta Gressitt, 1951

Species of beetle

Oberea acuta is a species of longhorn beetle in the tribe Saperdini in the genus Oberea, discovered by Gressitt in 1951.
