= Oberea inclusa =

Scientific classification
- Domain: Eukaryota
- Kingdom: Animalia
- Phylum: Arthropoda
- Class: Insecta
- Order: Coleoptera
- Suborder: Polyphaga
- Infraorder: Cucujiformia
- Family: Cerambycidae
- Genus: Oberea
- Species: O. inclusa

Binomial name
- Oberea inclusa Pascoe, 1858

Synonyms
- Oberea discipennis Fairmaire, 1889; Oberea inclusa m. partenigrescens Breuning, 1962; Oberea inclusa m. subnigripennis Breuning, 1969

Species of beetle

Oberea inclusa is a species of beetle in the family Cerambycidae. It was described by Francis Polkinghorne Pascoe in 1858.
