= Oberea incompleta =

Scientific classification
- Kingdom: Animalia
- Phylum: Arthropoda
- Class: Insecta
- Order: Coleoptera
- Suborder: Polyphaga
- Infraorder: Cucujiformia
- Family: Cerambycidae
- Genus: Oberea
- Species: O. incompleta

Binomial name
- Oberea incompleta Fairmaire, 1897

Species of beetle

Oberea incompleta is a species of beetle in the family Cerambycidae. It was described by Léon Fairmaire in 1897.
