= Oberea discoidalis =

Scientific classification
- Domain: Eukaryota
- Kingdom: Animalia
- Phylum: Arthropoda
- Class: Insecta
- Order: Coleoptera
- Suborder: Polyphaga
- Infraorder: Cucujiformia
- Family: Cerambycidae
- Genus: Oberea
- Species: O. discoidalis

Binomial name
- Oberea discoidalis (Jordan, 1894)

Synonyms
- Oberea discoidalis m. togoensis Teocchi, 1992; Nitocris discoidalis Jordan, 1894

Species of beetle

Oberea discoidalis is a species of beetle in the family Cerambycidae. It was described by Karl Jordan in 1894. It is known from the Republic of the Congo, Gabon, Cameroon, the Ivory Coast, and Sierra Leone. It contains the variety Oberea discoidalis var. occidentalis.
