= Oberea praemortua =

Scientific classification
- Domain: Eukaryota
- Kingdom: Animalia
- Phylum: Arthropoda
- Class: Insecta
- Order: Coleoptera
- Suborder: Polyphaga
- Infraorder: Cucujiformia
- Family: Cerambycidae
- Genus: Oberea
- Species: †O. praemortua

Binomial name
- †Oberea praemortua Heyden, 1862

Species of beetle

Oberea praemortua is an extinct species of beetle in the family Cerambycidae, that existed in what is now Germany during the Upper Oligocene. It was described by Heyden in 1862.
