= Oberea vittata =

Scientific classification
- Domain: Eukaryota
- Kingdom: Animalia
- Phylum: Arthropoda
- Class: Insecta
- Order: Coleoptera
- Suborder: Polyphaga
- Infraorder: Cucujiformia
- Family: Cerambycidae
- Genus: Oberea
- Species: O. vittata

Binomial name
- Oberea vittata Blessig, 1873

Species of beetle

Oberea vittata is a species of beetle in the family Cerambycidae. It was described by Blessig in 1873. It is known from Russia, China, Mongolia, and Japan.

== Subspecies ==
- Oberea vittata infranigrescens Breuning, 1947
- Oberea vittata vittata Blessig, 1873
