= Oberea herzi =

Scientific classification
- Domain: Eukaryota
- Kingdom: Animalia
- Phylum: Arthropoda
- Class: Insecta
- Order: Coleoptera
- Suborder: Polyphaga
- Infraorder: Cucujiformia
- Family: Cerambycidae
- Genus: Oberea
- Species: O. herzi

Binomial name
- Oberea herzi Ganglbauer, 1887

Species of beetle

Oberea herzi is a species of beetle in the family Cerambycidae. It was described by Ganglbauer in 1887.
