= Oberea punctiventris =

Scientific classification
- Domain: Eukaryota
- Kingdom: Animalia
- Phylum: Arthropoda
- Class: Insecta
- Order: Coleoptera
- Suborder: Polyphaga
- Infraorder: Cucujiformia
- Family: Cerambycidae
- Genus: Oberea
- Species: O. punctiventris

Binomial name
- Oberea punctiventris Heller, 1915

Species of beetle

Oberea punctiventris is a species of beetle in the family Cerambycidae. It was described by Heller in 1915. It is known from the Philippines.
