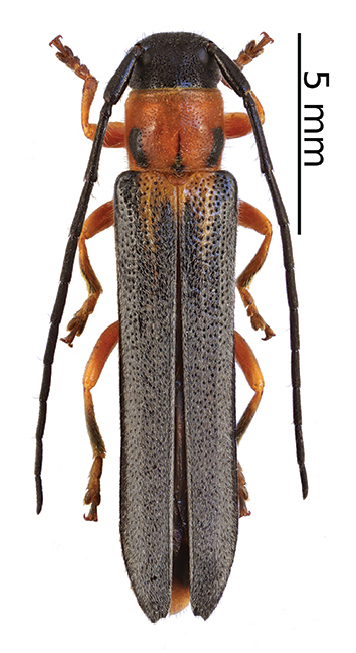

Scientific classification
- Domain: Eukaryota
- Kingdom: Animalia
- Phylum: Arthropoda
- Class: Insecta
- Order: Coleoptera
- Suborder: Polyphaga
- Infraorder: Cucujiformia
- Family: Cerambycidae
- Genus: Oberea
- Species: O. kostini

Binomial name
- Oberea kostini Danilevsky, 1988

= Oberea kostini =

Species of beetle

Oberea kostini is a species of beetle in the family Cerambycidae. It was described by Mikhail Leontievich Danilevsky in 1988. It is known from Russia.
