= Oberea nyassana =

Scientific classification
- Kingdom: Animalia
- Phylum: Arthropoda
- Class: Insecta
- Order: Coleoptera
- Suborder: Polyphaga
- Infraorder: Cucujiformia
- Family: Cerambycidae
- Genus: Oberea
- Species: O. nyassana

Binomial name
- Oberea nyassana Breuning, 1956

Species of beetle

Oberea nyassana is a species of beetle in the family Cerambycidae. It was described by Stephan von Breuning in 1956.

== Subspecies ==
- Oberea nyassana nyassana Breuning, 1956
- Oberea nyassana kenyensis Breuning, 1955
- Oberea nyassana meruensis Breuning, 1978
