= Oberea fusciventris =

Scientific classification
- Kingdom: Animalia
- Phylum: Arthropoda
- Class: Insecta
- Order: Coleoptera
- Suborder: Polyphaga
- Infraorder: Cucujiformia
- Family: Cerambycidae
- Genus: Oberea
- Species: O. fusciventris

Binomial name
- Oberea fusciventris Fairmaire, 1895

Species of beetle

Oberea fusciventris is a species of beetle in the family Cerambycidae. It was described by Léon Fairmaire in 1895.
