= Oberea neavei =

Scientific classification
- Domain: Eukaryota
- Kingdom: Animalia
- Phylum: Arthropoda
- Class: Insecta
- Order: Coleoptera
- Suborder: Polyphaga
- Infraorder: Cucujiformia
- Family: Cerambycidae
- Genus: Oberea
- Species: O. neavei

Binomial name
- Oberea neavei Aurivillius, 1914

Species of beetle

Oberea neavei is a species of beetle in the family Cerambycidae. It was described by Per Olof Christopher Aurivillius in 1914.

== Subspecies ==
- Oberea neavei tangana Breuning, 1974
- Oberea neavei neavei Aurivillius, 1914
