= Oberea semifusca =

Scientific classification
- Kingdom: Animalia
- Phylum: Arthropoda
- Class: Insecta
- Order: Coleoptera
- Suborder: Polyphaga
- Infraorder: Cucujiformia
- Family: Cerambycidae
- Genus: Oberea
- Species: O. semifusca

Binomial name
- Oberea semifusca Breuning, 1961

Species of beetle

Oberea semifusca is a species of beetle in the family Cerambycidae. It was described by Stephan von Breuning in 1961.
