= Oberea subelongatipennis =

Scientific classification
- Kingdom: Animalia
- Phylum: Arthropoda
- Class: Insecta
- Order: Coleoptera
- Suborder: Polyphaga
- Infraorder: Cucujiformia
- Family: Cerambycidae
- Genus: Oberea
- Species: O. subelongatipennis

Binomial name
- Oberea subelongatipennis Breuning, 1955

Species of beetle

Oberea subelongatipennis is a species of beetle in the family Cerambycidae. It was described by Stephan von Breuning in 1955.
