= Oberea distinctipennis =

Scientific classification
- Kingdom: Animalia
- Phylum: Arthropoda
- Class: Insecta
- Order: Coleoptera
- Suborder: Polyphaga
- Infraorder: Cucujiformia
- Family: Cerambycidae
- Genus: Oberea
- Species: O. distinctipennis

Binomial name
- Oberea distinctipennis Pic, 1902

Synonyms
- Oberea distinctipennis lateriventris Gressitt, 1939; Oberea thibetana Pic, 1916; Oberea distinctipennis distinctipennis Pic, 1902

Species of beetle

Oberea distinctipennis is a species of beetle in the family Cerambycidae. It was described by Maurice Pic in 1902. It is known from Vietnam, China and Laos.
