= Oberea nigriceps =

Scientific classification
- Domain: Eukaryota
- Kingdom: Animalia
- Phylum: Arthropoda
- Class: Insecta
- Order: Coleoptera
- Suborder: Polyphaga
- Infraorder: Cucujiformia
- Family: Cerambycidae
- Genus: Oberea
- Species: O. nigriceps

Binomial name
- Oberea nigriceps White, 1844

Synonyms
- Oberea binhana Pic, 1923

Species of beetle

Oberea nigriceps is a species of beetle in the family Cerambycidae. It was described by White in 1844.
