= Oberea isigakiana =

Scientific classification
- Kingdom: Animalia
- Phylum: Arthropoda
- Class: Insecta
- Order: Coleoptera
- Suborder: Polyphaga
- Infraorder: Cucujiformia
- Family: Cerambycidae
- Genus: Oberea
- Species: O. isigakiana

Binomial name
- Oberea isigakiana Matsushita, 1941

Species of beetle

Oberea isigakiana is a species of beetle in the family Cerambycidae. It was described by Masaki Matsushita in 1941.
