= Oberea pseudovaricornis =

Scientific classification
- Kingdom: Animalia
- Phylum: Arthropoda
- Class: Insecta
- Order: Coleoptera
- Suborder: Polyphaga
- Infraorder: Cucujiformia
- Family: Cerambycidae
- Genus: Oberea
- Species: O. pseudovaricornis

Binomial name
- Oberea pseudovaricornis Hunt & Breuning, 1956

Species of beetle

Oberea pseudovaricornis is a species of beetle in the family Cerambycidae. It was described by Hunt and Stephan von Breuning in 1956.
