= Oberea scutellaroides =

Scientific classification
- Kingdom: Animalia
- Phylum: Arthropoda
- Class: Insecta
- Order: Coleoptera
- Suborder: Polyphaga
- Infraorder: Cucujiformia
- Family: Cerambycidae
- Genus: Oberea
- Species: O. scutellaroides

Binomial name
- Oberea scutellaroides Breuning, 1947

Synonyms
- Oberea scutellaris Fairmaire, 1888 nec Gerstäcker, 1855; Oberea chinensis Tsherepanov, 1985

Species of beetle

Oberea scutellaroides is a species of beetle in the family Cerambycidae. It was described by Stephan von Breuning in 1947.
