= Oberea caseyi =

Scientific classification
- Domain: Eukaryota
- Kingdom: Animalia
- Phylum: Arthropoda
- Class: Insecta
- Order: Coleoptera
- Suborder: Polyphaga
- Infraorder: Cucujiformia
- Family: Cerambycidae
- Genus: Oberea
- Species: O. caseyi

Binomial name
- Oberea caseyi Plavilstshikov, 1926

Species of beetle

Oberea caseyi is a species of longhorn beetle in the tribe Saperdini in the genus Oberea, discovered by Plavilstshikov in 1926.
