= Oberea oculaticollis =

Scientific classification
- Domain: Eukaryota
- Kingdom: Animalia
- Phylum: Arthropoda
- Class: Insecta
- Order: Coleoptera
- Suborder: Polyphaga
- Infraorder: Cucujiformia
- Family: Cerambycidae
- Genus: Oberea
- Species: O. oculaticollis

Binomial name
- Oberea oculaticollis Say, 1824

Species of beetle

Oberea oculaticollis is a species of beetle in the family Cerambycidae. It was described by Thomas Say in 1824. It is known from North America.
