= Oberea sansibarica =

Scientific classification
- Domain: Eukaryota
- Kingdom: Animalia
- Phylum: Arthropoda
- Class: Insecta
- Order: Coleoptera
- Suborder: Polyphaga
- Infraorder: Cucujiformia
- Family: Cerambycidae
- Genus: Oberea
- Species: O. sansibarica

Binomial name
- Oberea sansibarica Harold, 1880

Species of beetle

Oberea sansibarica is a species of beetle in the family Cerambycidae. It was described by Harold in 1880.
