= Oberea donceeli =

Scientific classification
- Kingdom: Animalia
- Phylum: Arthropoda
- Class: Insecta
- Order: Coleoptera
- Suborder: Polyphaga
- Infraorder: Cucujiformia
- Family: Cerambycidae
- Genus: Oberea
- Species: O. donceeli

Binomial name
- Oberea donceeli Pic, 1907

Species of beetle

Oberea donceeli is a species of beetle in the family Cerambycidae. It was described by Maurice Pic in 1907. It is known from China, Mongolia and Russia.
