= Oberea reimschi =

Scientific classification
- Kingdom: Animalia
- Phylum: Arthropoda
- Class: Insecta
- Order: Coleoptera
- Suborder: Polyphaga
- Infraorder: Cucujiformia
- Family: Cerambycidae
- Genus: Oberea
- Species: O. reimschi

Binomial name
- Oberea reimschi Breuning, 1961

Species of beetle

Oberea reimschi is a species of beetle in the family Cerambycidae. It was described by Stephan von Breuning in 1961.
