= Oberea erythrostoma =

Scientific classification
- Domain: Eukaryota
- Kingdom: Animalia
- Phylum: Arthropoda
- Class: Insecta
- Order: Coleoptera
- Suborder: Polyphaga
- Infraorder: Cucujiformia
- Family: Cerambycidae
- Genus: Oberea
- Species: O. erythrostoma

Binomial name
- Oberea erythrostoma Heller, 1915

Synonyms
- Oberea erythrostoma m. partenigripes Breuning, 1961; Oberea erythrostoma m. cebuensis Breuning, 1961; Oberea erythrostoma m. banahoana Breuning, 1961; Oberea erythrostoma m. samarana Breuning, 1961; Oberea erythrostoma m. medionigricollis Breuning, 1961; Oberea erythrostoma m. melanothorax Breuning, 1961; Oberea erythrostoma m. antenigrescens Breuning, 1961; Oberea erythrostoma m. pseudomakilingi Breuning, 1961; Oberea erythrostoma m. samarensis Breuning, 1961; Oberea erythrostoma m. ruficuspis Breuning, 1961

Species of beetle

Oberea erythrostoma is a species of beetle in the family Cerambycidae. It was described by Heller in 1915. It is known from the Philippines.

== Varietas ==
- Oberea erythrostoma var. makilingi Heller, 1915
- Oberea erythrostoma var. albocuspis Heller, 1915
- Oberea erythrostoma var. schadenbergi Heller, 1915
