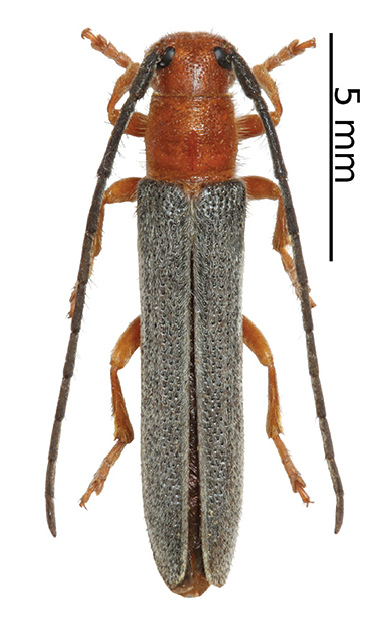

Scientific classification
- Domain: Eukaryota
- Kingdom: Animalia
- Phylum: Arthropoda
- Class: Insecta
- Order: Coleoptera
- Suborder: Polyphaga
- Infraorder: Cucujiformia
- Family: Cerambycidae
- Genus: Oberea
- Species: O. ruficeps

Binomial name
- Oberea ruficeps Fischer von Waldheim, 1842

= Oberea ruficeps =

Species of beetle

Oberea ruficeps is a species of beetle in the family Cerambycidae. It was described by Fischer von Waldheim in 1842.

== Subspecies ==
- Oberea ruficeps ruficeps Fischer von Waldheim, 1842
- Oberea ruficeps muchei Breuning, 1981
