= Oberea pallida =

Scientific classification
- Kingdom: Animalia
- Phylum: Arthropoda
- Class: Insecta
- Order: Coleoptera
- Suborder: Polyphaga
- Infraorder: Cucujiformia
- Family: Cerambycidae
- Genus: Oberea
- Species: O. pallida

Binomial name
- Oberea pallida Casey, 1913

Species of beetle

Oberea pallida is a species of flat-faced longhorn beetle in the tribe Saperdini in the genus Oberea, discovered by Casey in 1913.
