= Oberea annulicornis =

Scientific classification
- Domain: Eukaryota
- Kingdom: Animalia
- Phylum: Arthropoda
- Class: Insecta
- Order: Coleoptera
- Suborder: Polyphaga
- Infraorder: Cucujiformia
- Family: Cerambycidae
- Genus: Oberea
- Species: O. annulicornis

Binomial name
- Oberea annulicornis Pascoe, 1858

Species of beetle

Oberea annulicornis is a species of flat-faced longhorn beetle in the tribe Saperdini in the genus Oberea, discovered by Francis Polkinghorne Pascoe in 1858.
