= Oberea morio =

Scientific classification
- Domain: Eukaryota
- Kingdom: Animalia
- Phylum: Arthropoda
- Class: Insecta
- Order: Coleoptera
- Suborder: Polyphaga
- Infraorder: Cucujiformia
- Family: Cerambycidae
- Genus: Oberea
- Species: O. morio

Binomial name
- Oberea morio Kraatz, 1879

Synonyms
- Oberea coreana Pic, 1912

Species of beetle

Oberea morio is a species of beetle in the family Cerambycidae. It was described by Kraatz in 1879. It is known from China, Russia and Mongolia.
