= Oberea histrionis =

Scientific classification
- Kingdom: Animalia
- Phylum: Arthropoda
- Class: Insecta
- Order: Coleoptera
- Suborder: Polyphaga
- Infraorder: Cucujiformia
- Family: Cerambycidae
- Genus: Oberea
- Species: O. histrionis

Binomial name
- Oberea histrionis Pic, 1917

Synonyms
- Oberea euphorbiae var. histrionis Pic, 1917; Oberea euphorbiae m. histrionis (Pic) Breuning, 1962; Oberea moravica Kratochvíl, 1989; Oberea (Amaurostoma) euphorbiae (Germar) Sama, 2010

Species of beetle

Oberea histrionis is a species of beetle in the family Cerambycidae. It was described by Maurice Pic in 1917. It is known from Hungary, the Czech Republic, Slovakia, Moldova, Austria, and Ukraine. It feeds on Euphorbia lucida.

Oberea histrionis measures between 13 and 19 mm (0.51 and 0.75 in).
