= Oberea rubetra =

Scientific classification
- Kingdom: Animalia
- Phylum: Arthropoda
- Clade: Pancrustacea
- Class: Insecta
- Order: Coleoptera
- Suborder: Polyphaga
- Infraorder: Cucujiformia
- Family: Cerambycidae
- Genus: Oberea
- Species: O. rubetra

Binomial name
- Oberea rubetra Pascoe, 1858

Synonyms
- Oberea insularis Fisher, 1937; Oberea parterufipes Breuning, 1961; Oberea lusciosa Pascoe, 1867; Oberea mediorufinipes Breuning, 1961; Oberea basinigricollis Breuning, 1961

Species of beetle

Oberea rubetra is a species of beetle in the family Cerambycidae. It was described by Francis Polkinghorne Pascoe in 1858. It is known from Sumatra, Borneo and Malaysia.

== Subspecies ==
- Oberea rubetra sikkimana Breuning, 1982
- Oberea rubetra rubetra Pascoe, 1858
