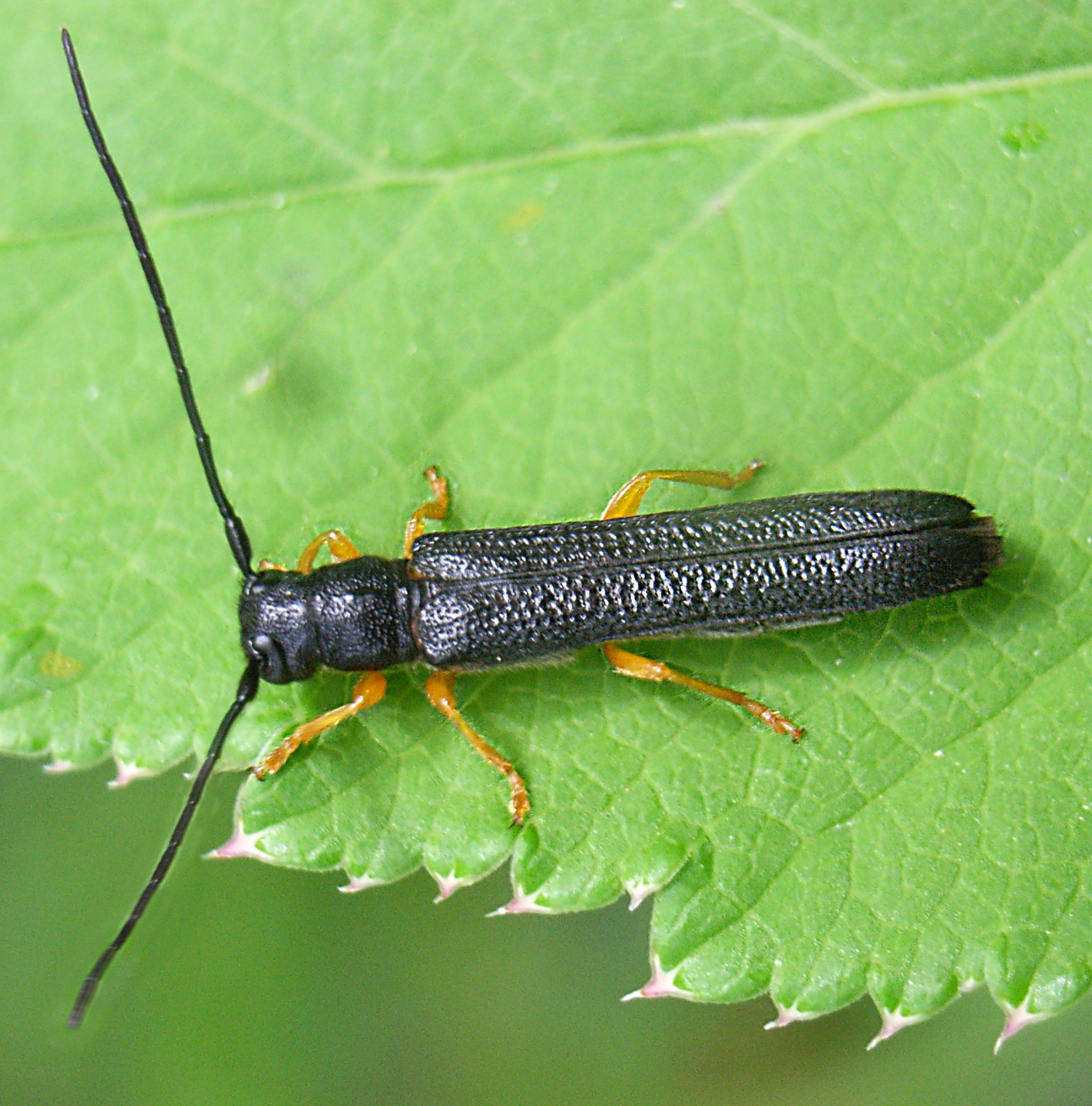

Scientific classification
- Kingdom: Animalia
- Phylum: Arthropoda
- Class: Insecta
- Order: Coleoptera
- Suborder: Polyphaga
- Infraorder: Cucujiformia
- Family: Cerambycidae
- Genus: Oberea
- Species: O. linearis

Binomial name
- Oberea linearis (Linnaeus, 1761)

Synonyms
- Leptura fulvipes Geoffroy, 1785; Cerambyx linearis Linnaeus, 1761; Cerambyx regularis Poda, 1761; Saperda cylindricollis Griffith, 1832; Saperda linearis (Linnaeus, 1761); Oberea linearis m. parterufoabdominalis Breuning, 1974

= Oberea linearis =

Species of beetle

Oberea linearis is a species of beetle in the family Cerambycidae. It was described by Carl Linnaeus in 1761, originally under the genus Cerambyx. It has a wide distribution throughout Europe. It is preyed upon by Opilo pallidus, and serves as a host for the parasitic wasp species Dolichomitus messor and Phaenolobus terebrator. It feeds on Juglans regia, Corylus avellana, Ulmus glabra, Ostrya carpinifolia, and Carpinus betulus. It contains the varietas Oberea linearis var. parallela.

Oberea linearis measures between 11 and 14 mm (0.43 and 0.55 in).
