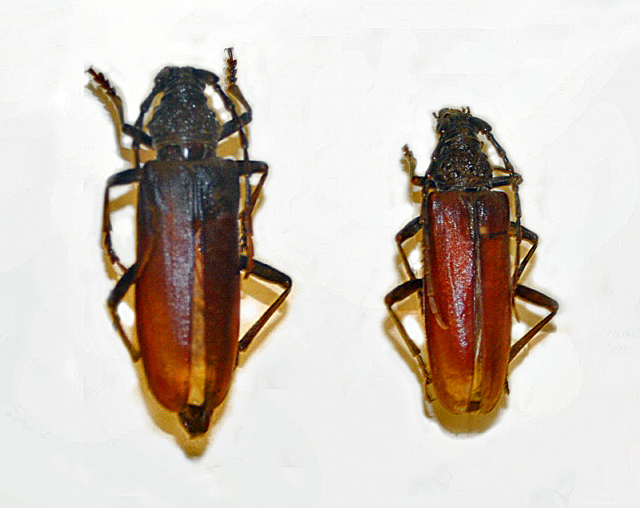
- Cerambyx welensii. Museum specimen

Scientific classification
- Domain: Eukaryota
- Kingdom: Animalia
- Phylum: Arthropoda
- Class: Insecta
- Order: Coleoptera
- Suborder: Polyphaga
- Infraorder: Cucujiformia
- Family: Cerambycidae
- Genus: Cerambyx
- Species: C. welensii

Binomial name
- Cerambyx welensii (Küster, 1846)

Synonyms
- Cerambyx velutinus Brullé, 1832 (nec Fabricius, 1775); Hammaticherus welensii Küster, 1846; Cerambyx centurio Czawallina, 1891; Cerambyx velutinus tuniseus Pic, 189

= Cerambyx welensii =

Species of beetle

Cerambyx welensii is a species of beetle in the family Cerambycidae (longhorn beetles). This species demonstrates sexual dimorphism, characterized by physical and behavioral differences between males and females, due to their varying body and antenna sizes.

== Subspecies ==
Subspecies include:

- Cerambyx welensii centurio Czwalina, 1891
- Cerambyx welensii welensii Küster, 1846

== Distribution ==
This species is widespread in Southern Europe, North Africa, and the Near East. It is present in Albania, Bosnia and Herzegovina, Bulgaria, Croatia, France, Greece, Hungary, Italy, Jordan, Lebanon, Malta, Morocco, Portugal, Romania, Sicily, Slovakia, Slovenia, Spain, Syria, Tunisia, Morocco, Jordan, Lebanon, Israel and Azerbaijan.

== Description ==
Cerambyx welensii can reach a length of 25–58 millimetres (0.98–2.28 in). These beetles have an elongated body. Antennae of males extend beyond the apex of the elytra by last three antennal segments. The basic color is brownish, with clearer apex of the elytra. Elytra are entirely covered by a thick, white to yellowish setae and have rounded apex. The pronotum shows a thorny tubercle on its sides. This species is rather similar to Cerambyx carinatus and to Cerambyx cerdo.

== Biology ==
Larvae of these beetles are xylophagous. They mainly feed on downy oak (Quercus pubescens), evergreen oak (Quercus ilex) and cork oak (Quercus suber). These longhorn beetle are considered a pest of oaks. Females are polyandrous and males are polygynous.
