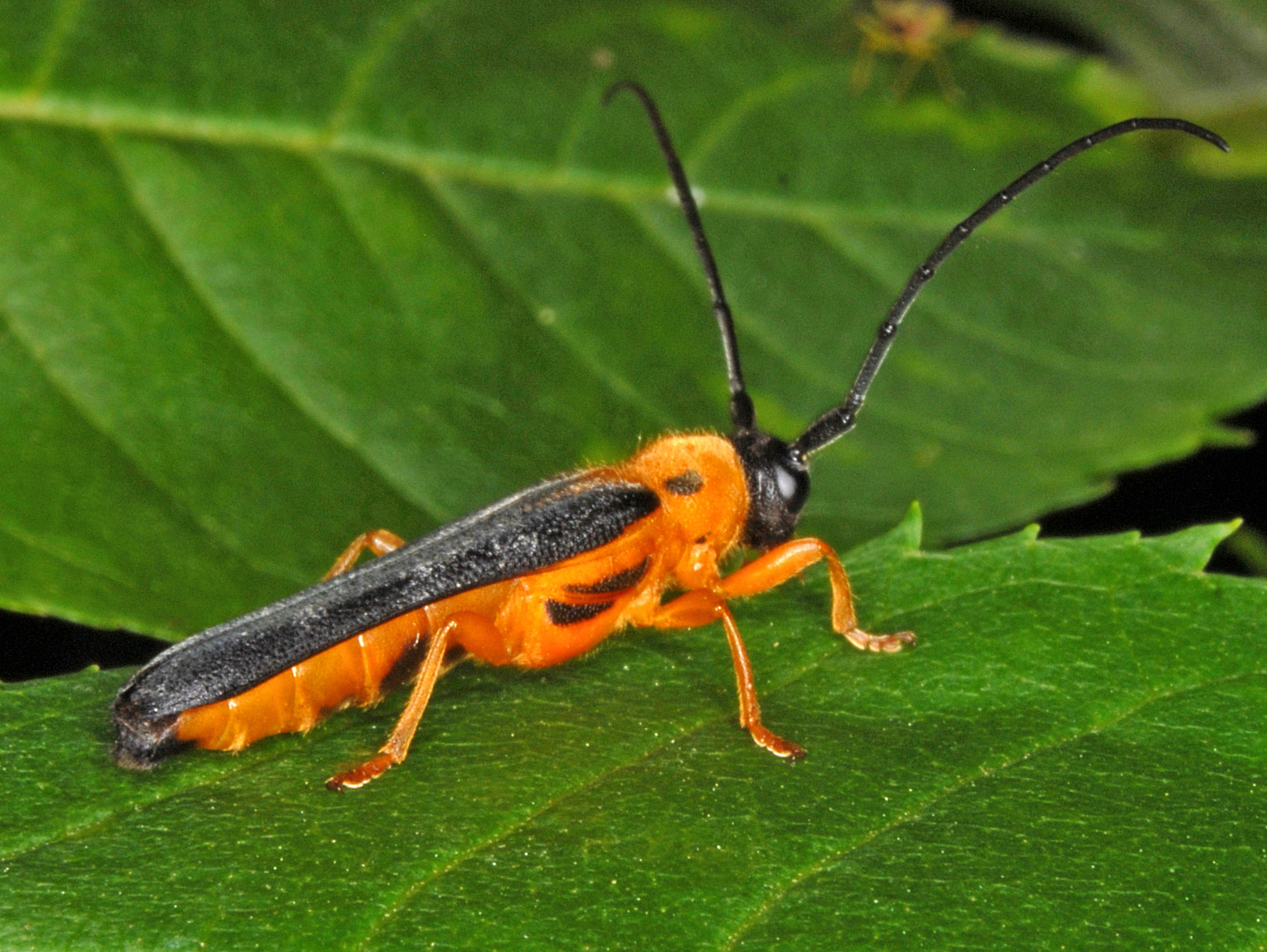
- Oberea pupillata. Female

Scientific classification
- Kingdom: Animalia
- Phylum: Arthropoda
- Class: Insecta
- Order: Coleoptera
- Suborder: Polyphaga
- Infraorder: Cucujiformia
- Family: Cerambycidae
- Genus: Oberea
- Species: O. pupillata

Binomial name
- Oberea pupillata (Gyllenhal, 1817)

Synonyms
- List: Oberea pupillata Denux, 2005; Oberea pupillata Gouillard, 2003; Oberea pupillata Haeselbarth, 1983; Oberea pupillata Haeselbarth, 1985; Oberea pupillata Küster, 1846; Oberea pupillata Micas, 2005; Oberea pupillata Mouthiez & Péru, 2008; Oberea pupillata Mulsant, 1839; Oberea pupillata Pesarini & Sabbadini, 2007; Oberea pupillata Sama, 2003; Oberea pupillata Secchi, 1998; Oberea pupillata Severin, 1889; Oberea pupillata Teocchi, 1970; Oberea pupillata Villiers, 1978; Oberea pupillata alsatica Pic, 1915; Oberea pupillata bimaculatoides Breuning, 1947; Oberea pupillata cognata small> Kugelann, 1857; Oberea pupillata luteonotata Pic, 1918; Oberea pupillata pseudodepressa Breuning, 1947; Oberea (oberea) pupillata Brustel, Berger & Cocquempot, 2003; Saperda pupillata Goureau, 1866; Saperda pupillata Gyllenhal, 1817

= Oberea pupillata =

Species of beetle

Oberea pupillata is a species of beetle in the family Cerambycidae. It was described by Leonard Gyllenhaal in 1817, originally under the genus Saperda.

== Distribution ==
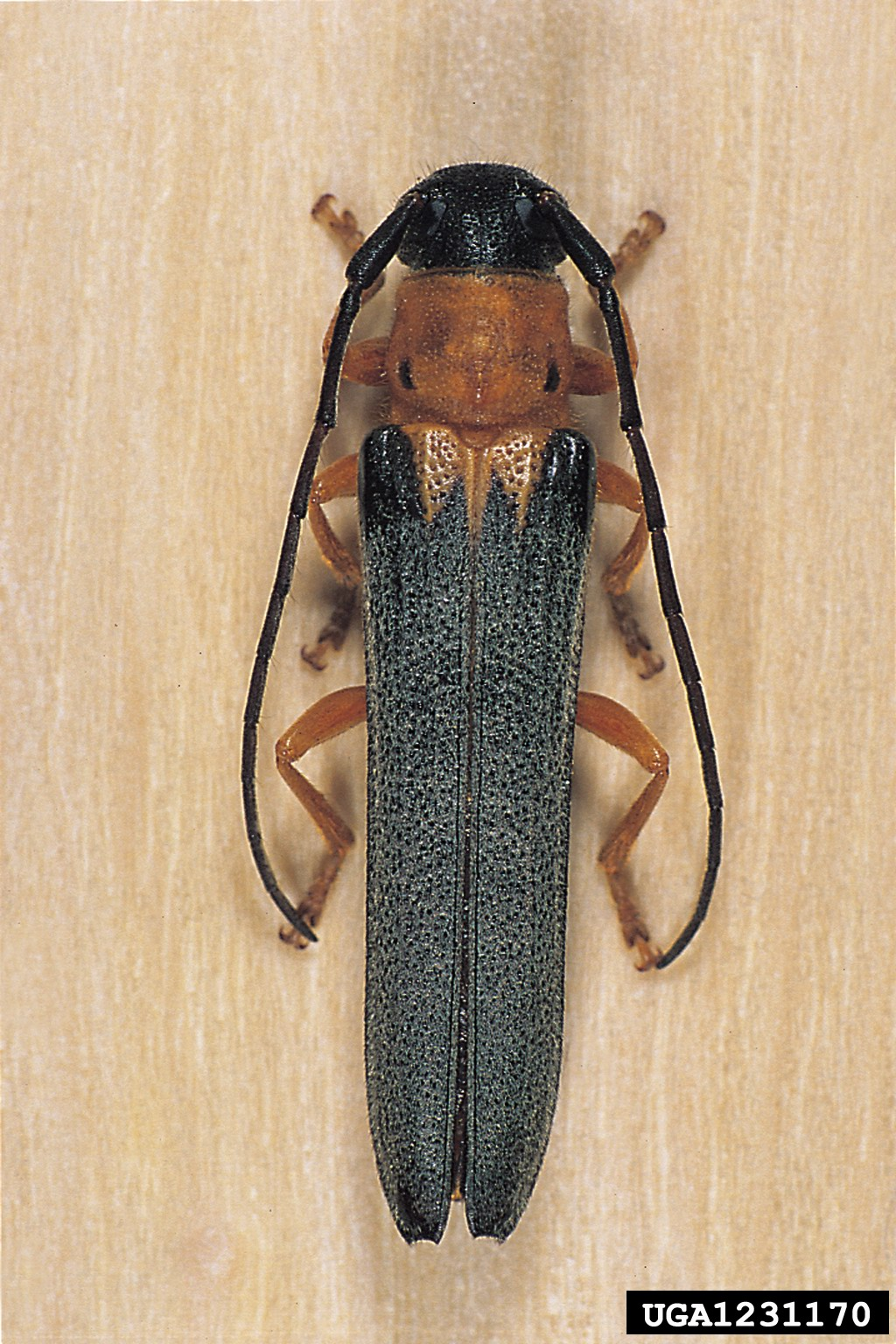
Mounted specimen

This species has a wide distribution throughout Europe. It is present in Austria, Belarus, Belgium, Bosnia and Herzegovina, Croatia, Czech Republic (Bohemia, Moravia), Estonia, France, Germany, Greece, Hungary, Italy, Latvia, Lithuania, Moldova, North Macedonia, Poland, Romania, Russia, Slovakia, Slovenia, Spain, Switzerland and Ukraine.

== Habitat ==
These beetles mainly inhabit sub-mountainous environments and forest edges, but they can also be found in parks where the host plant is present.

== Description ==
Oberea pupillata measures between 13 and 18 mm (0.51 and 0.71 in). These beetles have a long and slender body. Head, thorax and abdomen have all about same width, and elytra are not tapered. Head and antennae are black and antennae are shorter than body. Pronotum is orange with two elongated black spots on the sides. The elytra are mostly blackish, yellowish at the base and rather hairy. The body is orange, with black markings on the sides and below the abdomen. The last abdominal segment shows a black mark. The legs are orange.

This species in quite similar to Oberea oculata (Linnaeus, 1758).

== Biology ==
Adults fly from May to September. The life cycle lasts from two to three years. Usually a single egg is laid in a branch of the host plant, after making an incision on the bark. Larvae are xylophagous. These stem borers live and feed mostly in longitudinal galleries on etruscan honeysuckle (Lonicera etrusca).

== Bibliography ==
- Edmund Reitter: Fauna Germanica – Die Käfer des Deutschen Reiches. 5 Bände, Stuttgart K. G. Lutz 1908–1916, Digitale Bibliothek Band 134, Directmedia Publishing GmbH, Berlin 2006, ISBN 3-898-53534-7
- Gyllenhal Leonard (1817) Appendix ad C. J. Schönherr Synonymiam Insectorum. Descriptiones Novarum Specierum Insectorum, In Schönherr. Scaris, in Officina Lewerentziana 1 (3): 1-266
- Heiko Bellmann: Welches Insekt ist das? Franckh-Kosmos, Stuttgart 2005, ISBN 3-440-09874-5
- Tronquet, M. 2014. Catalogue des Coléoptères de France. Revue de l’Association Roussillonnaise d’Entomologie, 23 (Supplément): 1-1052
