= Oberea cariniscapus =

Scientific classification
- Kingdom: Animalia
- Phylum: Arthropoda
- Class: Insecta
- Order: Coleoptera
- Suborder: Polyphaga
- Infraorder: Cucujiformia
- Family: Cerambycidae
- Genus: Oberea
- Species: O. cariniscapus

Binomial name
- Oberea cariniscapus Breuning, 1956

Species of beetle

Oberea cariniscapus is a species of longhorn beetle in the tribe Saperdini in the genus Oberea, discovered in 1956 by Breuning.
