= Oberea birmanica =

Scientific classification
- Domain: Eukaryota
- Kingdom: Animalia
- Phylum: Arthropoda
- Class: Insecta
- Order: Coleoptera
- Suborder: Polyphaga
- Infraorder: Cucujiformia
- Family: Cerambycidae
- Genus: Oberea
- Species: O. birmanica

Binomial name
- Oberea birmanica Gahan, 1895

Species of beetle

Oberea birmanica is a species of flat-faced longhorn beetle in the tribe Saperdini in the genus Oberea, discovered by Gahan in 1895.
