= Oberea affinis =

Scientific classification
- Domain: Eukaryota
- Kingdom: Animalia
- Phylum: Arthropoda
- Class: Insecta
- Order: Coleoptera
- Suborder: Polyphaga
- Infraorder: Cucujiformia
- Family: Cerambycidae
- Genus: Oberea
- Species: O. affinis

Binomial name
- Oberea affinis Harris, 1841

Species of beetle

Oberea affinis is a species of longhorn beetle in the tribe Saperdini in the genus Oberea, discovered by Leng & Hamilton in 1896.
