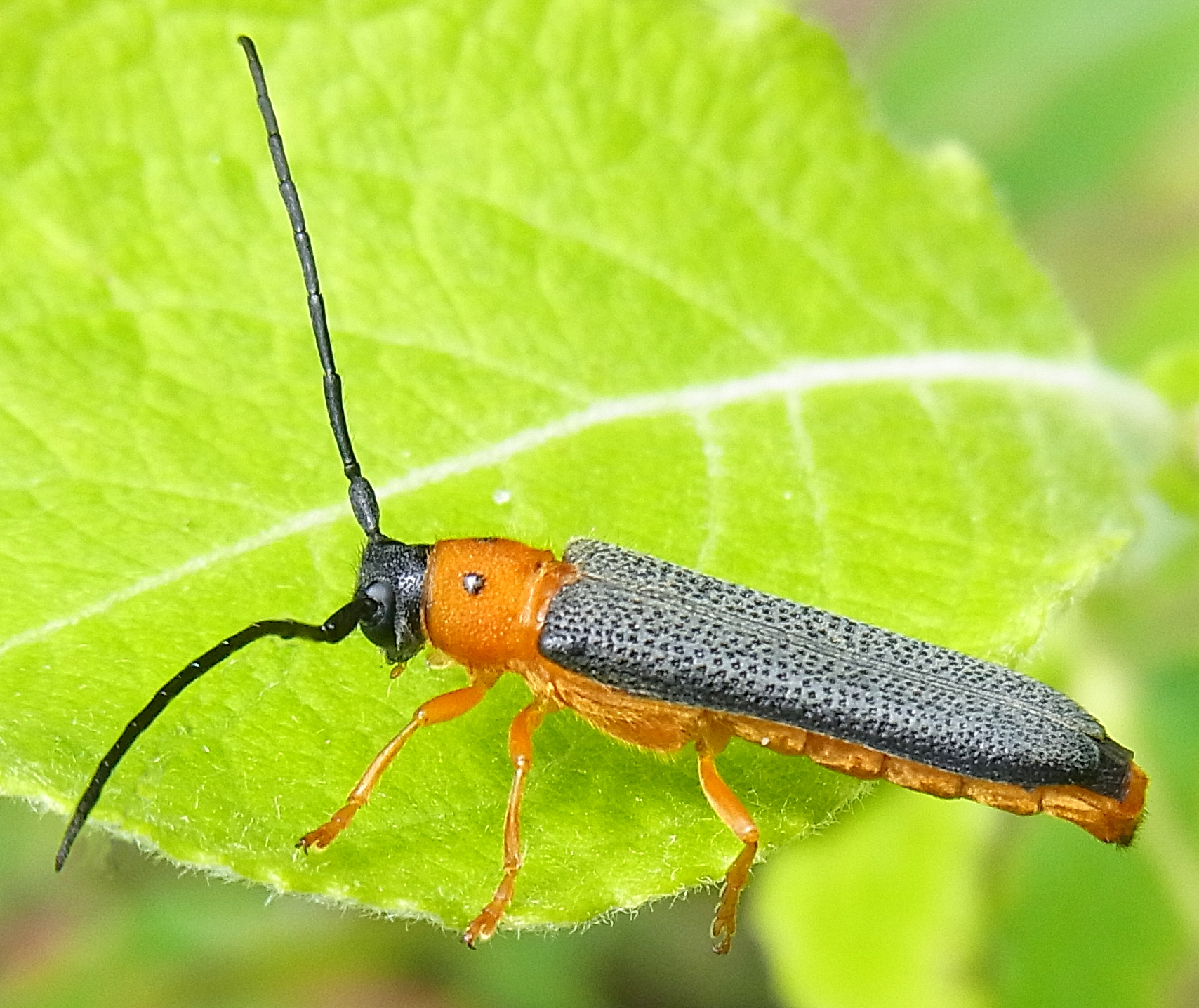

Scientific classification
- Kingdom: Animalia
- Phylum: Arthropoda
- Class: Insecta
- Order: Coleoptera
- Suborder: Polyphaga
- Infraorder: Cucujiformia
- Family: Cerambycidae
- Genus: Oberea
- Species: O. oculata

Binomial name
- Oberea oculata (Linnaeus, 1758)

Synonyms
- Cerambyx oculatus Linnaeus, 1758; Leptura oculata (Linnaeus, 1758); Saperda oculata (Linnaeus, 1758); Leptura melanocephalus Voet, 1778 (Unav.)

= Oberea oculata =

Species of beetle

Oberea oculata is a species of beetle in the family Cerambycidae. It was described by Carl Linnaeus in 1758, originally under the genus Cerambyx. It has a wide distribution throughout Europe. It feeds on Salix alba, Salix acutifolia, Salix pentandra, Salix caprea, and Salix triandra, and serves as a host for the parasitic wasp Ephialtes manifestator.

Oberea oculata measures between 15 and 21 mm (0.59 and 0.83 in).
