= Oberea maculicollis =

Scientific classification
- Domain: Eukaryota
- Kingdom: Animalia
- Phylum: Arthropoda
- Class: Insecta
- Order: Coleoptera
- Suborder: Polyphaga
- Infraorder: Cucujiformia
- Family: Cerambycidae
- Genus: Oberea
- Species: O. maculicollis

Binomial name
- Oberea maculicollis Lucas, 1842

Species of beetle

Oberea maculicollis is a species of beetle in the family Cerambycidae. It was described by Hippolyte Lucas in 1842. It is known from Spain and Algeria.
