= Oberea adumbrata =

Scientific classification
- Domain: Eukaryota
- Kingdom: Animalia
- Phylum: Arthropoda
- Class: Insecta
- Order: Coleoptera
- Suborder: Polyphaga
- Infraorder: Cucujiformia
- Family: Cerambycidae
- Genus: Oberea
- Species: O. adumbrata

Binomial name
- Oberea adumbrata (Tippmann, 1958)

Species of beetle

Oberea adumbrata is a species of longhorn beetle in the tribe Saperdini in the genus Oberea, discovered by Tippman in 1958.
