= Oberea bisbipunctata =

Scientific classification
- Kingdom: Animalia
- Phylum: Arthropoda
- Class: Insecta
- Order: Coleoptera
- Suborder: Polyphaga
- Infraorder: Cucujiformia
- Family: Cerambycidae
- Genus: Oberea
- Species: O. bisbipunctata

Binomial name
- Oberea bisbipunctata Pic, 1916

Species of beetle

Oberea bisbipunctata is a species of flat-faced longhorn beetle in the tribe Saperdini in the genus Oberea, described by Maurice Pic in 1916.

== Subspecies ==
- Oberea bisbipunctata discoreducta Breuning, 1969
- Oberea bisbipunctata bisbipunctata Pic, 1916
