= Oberea annamensis =

Scientific classification
- Kingdom: Animalia
- Phylum: Arthropoda
- Class: Insecta
- Order: Coleoptera
- Suborder: Polyphaga
- Infraorder: Cucujiformia
- Family: Cerambycidae
- Genus: Oberea
- Species: O. annamensis

Binomial name
- Oberea annamensis Breuning, 1969

Species of beetle

Oberea annamensis is a species of longhorn beetle in the tribe Saperdini in the genus Oberea, discovered by Breuning in 1969.
