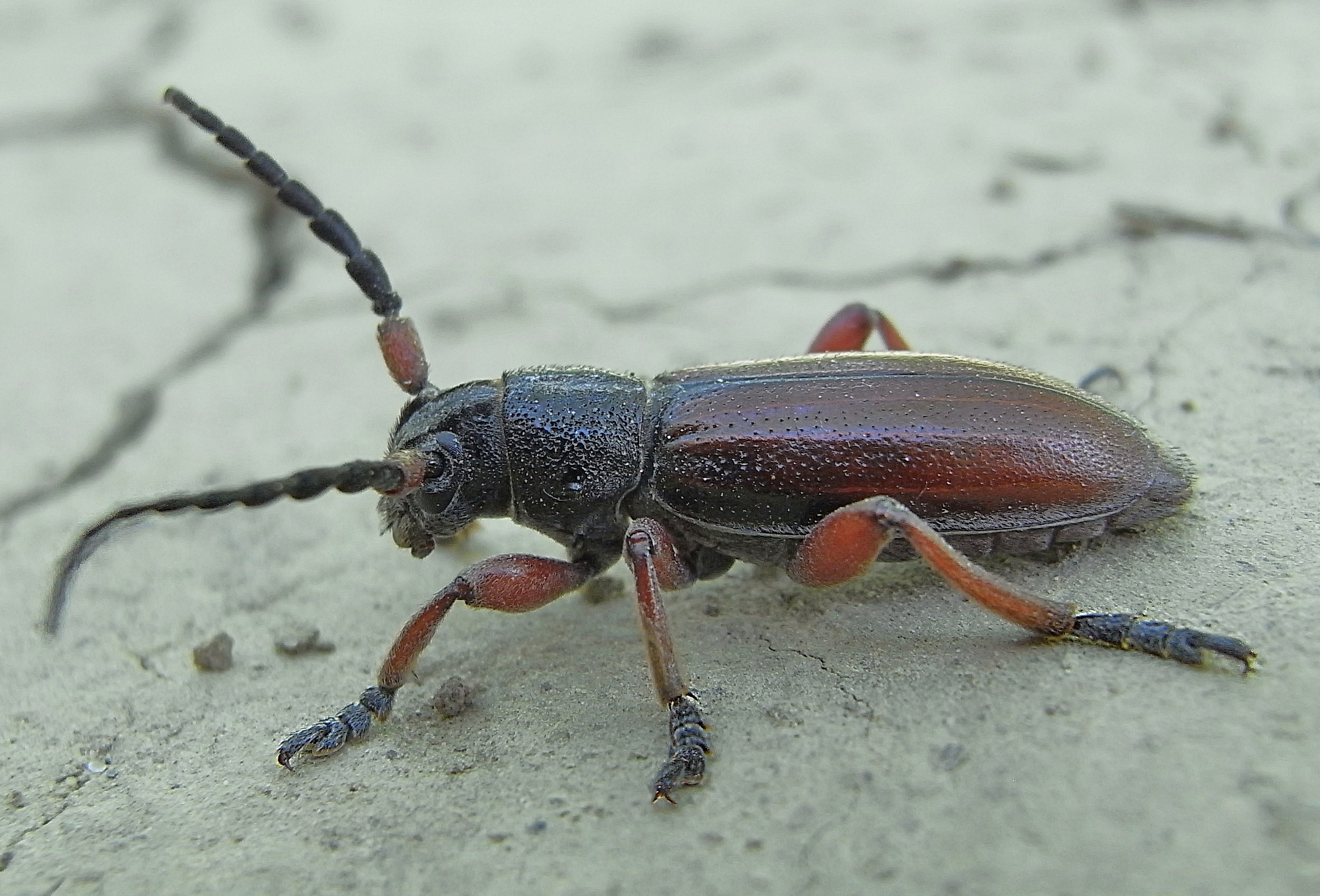

Scientific classification
- Kingdom: Animalia
- Phylum: Arthropoda
- Clade: Pancrustacea
- Class: Insecta
- Order: Coleoptera
- Suborder: Polyphaga
- Infraorder: Cucujiformia
- Family: Cerambycidae
- Genus: Dorcadion fulvum (Scopoli, 1763)

Synonyms
- Carinatodorcadion fulvum (Scopoli, 1763); Cerambyx fulvus Scopoli, 1763; Dorcadion (Autodorcadion) fulvum (Scopoli, 1763); Prionus sanguinolentus Scopoli, 1772; Cerambyx morio (Fabricius) Olivier, 1795 nec Fabricius, 1787 (partim.); Cerambyx scopolii Gmelin, 1790 nec Füssli, 1775 (partim.); Lamia morio Fabricius, 1767 (partim.); Dorcadion fulvum opillicum Zamoroka, 2019

= Dorcadion fulvum =

Species of beetle

Dorcadion fulvum is a species of beetle in the family Cerambycidae. It was described by Scopoli in 1763, originally under the genus Cerambyx. It is known from central and eastern Europe.

== Subspecies ==
- Dorcadion fulvum erythropterum Fischer von Waldheim, 1823
- Dorcadion fulvum fulvum (Scopoli, 1763)
- Dorcadion fulvum heracles Vartanis, 2024
- Dorcadion fulvum odessum Lazarev, 2024
