= Oberea ocellata =

Scientific classification
- Domain: Eukaryota
- Kingdom: Animalia
- Phylum: Arthropoda
- Class: Insecta
- Order: Coleoptera
- Suborder: Polyphaga
- Infraorder: Cucujiformia
- Family: Cerambycidae
- Genus: Oberea
- Species: O. ocellata

Binomial name
- Oberea ocellata Haldeman, 1847

Species of beetle

Oberea ocellata, the sumac stem borer, is a species of flat-faced longhorn beetle in the tribe Saperdini in the genus Oberea, discovered by Haldeman. It is a notable pest of trees and can cause serious damage if not stopped.

== Life cycle ==
During June, adult female sumac stem borers lay eggs individually under the bark of a blueberry cane towards the terminal end of the tree. Larvae hatch after two weeks, and begin drilling towards the terminal of the three. They reverse direction and burrow in the crown of their host plants. Between 2 and 10 inches of the stem may be consumed during the first year. With the onset of winter, larvae become inactive, but resume feeding in the spring. The larvae drill not only to the crown but into adjacent stems, goring for the whole year, and then become adults by the end of the third year. After this, the life cycle continues as the larvae leave the host.

== Pest control ==
While the sumac stem borer has some biological enemies, notably Lixophaga variabilis and Bracon ceramycidiphagus, they are not significant enough to control the species' population. The beetle is easy to detect, thanks to its distinctive light yellow frass. When an infestation occurs, cut the blueberry cane stem below the hollow infested section so that the sumac stem borer will never reach the crown of the tree.
