= Oberea bimaculata =

Scientific classification
- Kingdom: Animalia
- Phylum: Arthropoda
- Clade: Pancrustacea
- Class: Insecta
- Order: Coleoptera
- Suborder: Polyphaga
- Infraorder: Cucujiformia
- Family: Cerambycidae
- Genus: Oberea
- Species: O. bimaculata

Binomial name
- Oberea bimaculata Olivier, 1795

Species of beetle

Oberea bimaculata is a species of flat-faced longhorn beetle in the tribe Saperdini in the genus Oberea, discovered by Olivier in 1795.
