= Gnoma zonaria =

Scientific classification
- Kingdom: Animalia
- Phylum: Arthropoda
- Class: Insecta
- Order: Coleoptera
- Suborder: Polyphaga
- Infraorder: Cucujiformia
- Family: Cerambycidae
- Genus: Gnoma
- Species: G. zonaria

Binomial name
- Gnoma zonaria (Linnaeus, 1758)

Synonyms
- Cerambyx giraffa Schreiber, 1802; Cerambyx zonarius Linnaeus, 1758; Gnoma albotesselata Blanchard, 1853; Gnoma antilope Boisduval, 1835; Gnoma giraffa (Schreiber) Donovan, 1805

Species of beetle

Gnoma zonaria is a species of beetle in the family Cerambycidae. It was described by Carl Linnaeus in 1758, originally under the genus Cerambyx. It is known from Papua New Guinea and Moluccas.

== Subspecies ==
- Gnoma zonaria albovaria Breuning, 1945
- Gnoma zonaria zonaria (Linnaeus, 1758)
