= Oberea compta =

Scientific classification
- Domain: Eukaryota
- Kingdom: Animalia
- Phylum: Arthropoda
- Class: Insecta
- Order: Coleoptera
- Suborder: Polyphaga
- Infraorder: Cucujiformia
- Family: Cerambycidae
- Genus: Oberea
- Species: O. compta

Binomial name
- Oberea compta Pascoe, 1867

Species of beetle

Oberea compta is a species of longhorn beetle in the tribe Saperdini in the genus Oberea, discovered by Pascoe in 1867.
