= Oberea bimaculicollis =

Scientific classification
- Kingdom: Animalia
- Phylum: Arthropoda
- Class: Insecta
- Order: Coleoptera
- Suborder: Polyphaga
- Infraorder: Cucujiformia
- Family: Cerambycidae
- Genus: Oberea
- Species: O. bimaculicollis

Binomial name
- Oberea bimaculicollis Breuning, 1961

Species of beetle

Oberea bimaculicollis is a species of flat-faced longhorn beetle in the tribe Saperdini in the genus Oberea, discovered by Breuning in 1961.
