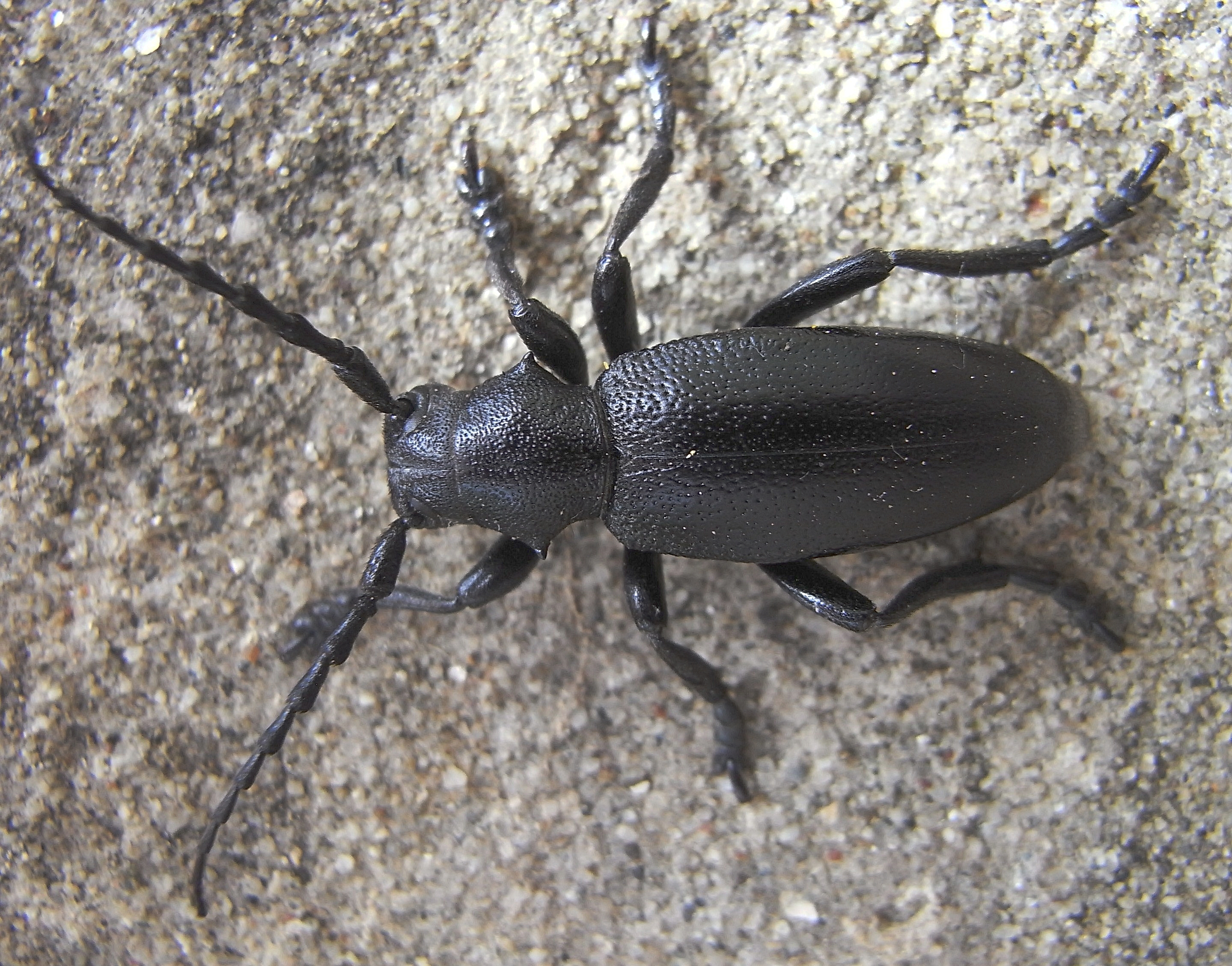

Scientific classification
- Kingdom: Animalia
- Phylum: Arthropoda
- Clade: Pancrustacea
- Class: Insecta
- Order: Coleoptera
- Suborder: Polyphaga
- Infraorder: Cucujiformia
- Family: Cerambycidae
- Genus: Dorcadion
- Species: D. aethiops

Binomial name
- Dorcadion aethiops (Scopoli, 1763)

Synonyms
- Carinatodorcadion aethiops (Scopoli, 1763); Cerambyx aethiops Scopoli, 1763; Cerambyx morio (Fabricius) Olivier, 1795 nec Fabricius, 1787; Dorcadion (Autodorcadion) aethiops (Scopoli, 1763); Cerambyx scopolii Gmelin, 1790 nec Füssli, 1775 (partim); Dorcadion morio (Fabricius, 1787) (partim); Lamia morio Fabricius, 1787 (partim)

= Dorcadion aethiops =

Species of beetle

Dorcadion aethiops is a species of beetle in the family Cerambycidae. It was described by Giovanni Antonio Scopoli in 1763, originally under the genus Cerambyx. It is known from the Czech Republic, Albania, Greece, Bulgaria, Croatia, Hungary, Slovakia, North Macedonia, Romania, Austria, Turkey, Serbia, and Ukraine.

== Subspecies ==
- Dorcadion aethiops aethiops (Scopoli, 1763)
- Dorcadion aethiops majoripenne Pic, 1926

== See also ==
Dorcadion
