= Oberea batoensis =

Scientific classification
- Kingdom: Animalia
- Phylum: Arthropoda
- Class: Insecta
- Order: Coleoptera
- Suborder: Polyphaga
- Infraorder: Cucujiformia
- Family: Cerambycidae
- Genus: Oberea
- Species: O. batoensis

Binomial name
- Oberea batoensis Breuning, 1951

Species of beetle

Oberea batoensis is a species of flat-faced longhorn beetle in the tribe Saperdini in the genus Oberea, discovered by Breuning in 1951. Two subspecies of Oberia batoensis have been found. These subspecies are Oberia batoensis batoensis and Oberia batoensis nigrata.
