= Oberea kualabokensis =

Scientific classification
- Kingdom: Animalia
- Phylum: Arthropoda
- Class: Insecta
- Order: Coleoptera
- Suborder: Polyphaga
- Infraorder: Cucujiformia
- Family: Cerambycidae
- Genus: Oberea
- Species: O. kualabokensis

Binomial name
- Oberea kualabokensis Hayashi, 1976

Species of beetle

Oberea is a species of longhorn beetle in the tribe Saperdini in the genus Oberea, discovered by Hayashi in 1976.
