= Oberea bivittata =

Scientific classification
- Domain: Eukaryota
- Kingdom: Animalia
- Phylum: Arthropoda
- Class: Insecta
- Order: Coleoptera
- Suborder: Polyphaga
- Infraorder: Cucujiformia
- Family: Cerambycidae
- Genus: Oberea
- Species: O. bivittata

Binomial name
- Oberea bivittata Aurivillius, 1911

Species of beetle

Oberea bivittata is a species of flat-faced longhorn beetle in the tribe Saperdini in the genus Oberea. It was described by Per Olof Christopher Aurivillius in 1911.
