= Oberea mauritanica =

Scientific classification
- Domain: Eukaryota
- Kingdom: Animalia
- Phylum: Arthropoda
- Class: Insecta
- Order: Coleoptera
- Suborder: Polyphaga
- Infraorder: Cucujiformia
- Family: Cerambycidae
- Genus: Oberea
- Species: O. mauritanica

Binomial name
- Oberea mauritanica Lucas, 1888

Species of beetle

Oberea mauritanica is a species of beetle in the family Cerambycidae. It was described by Hippolyte Lucas in 1888. It is known from Algeria.
