= Gnoma sticticollis =

Scientific classification
- Kingdom: Animalia
- Phylum: Arthropoda
- Clade: Pancrustacea
- Class: Insecta
- Order: Coleoptera
- Suborder: Polyphaga
- Infraorder: Cucujiformia
- Family: Cerambycidae
- Genus: Gnoma
- Species: G. sticticollis

Binomial name
- Gnoma sticticollis Thomson, 1857

Synonyms
- Gnoma dispersa Pascoe, 1866; Gnoma raffrayi Thomson, 1878; Gnoma subfasciata Thomson, 1865

Species of beetle

Gnoma sticticollis is a species of beetle in the family Cerambycidae. It was described by Thomson in 1857. It is known from Malaysia, Singapore, Java, and possibly Sulawesi.
