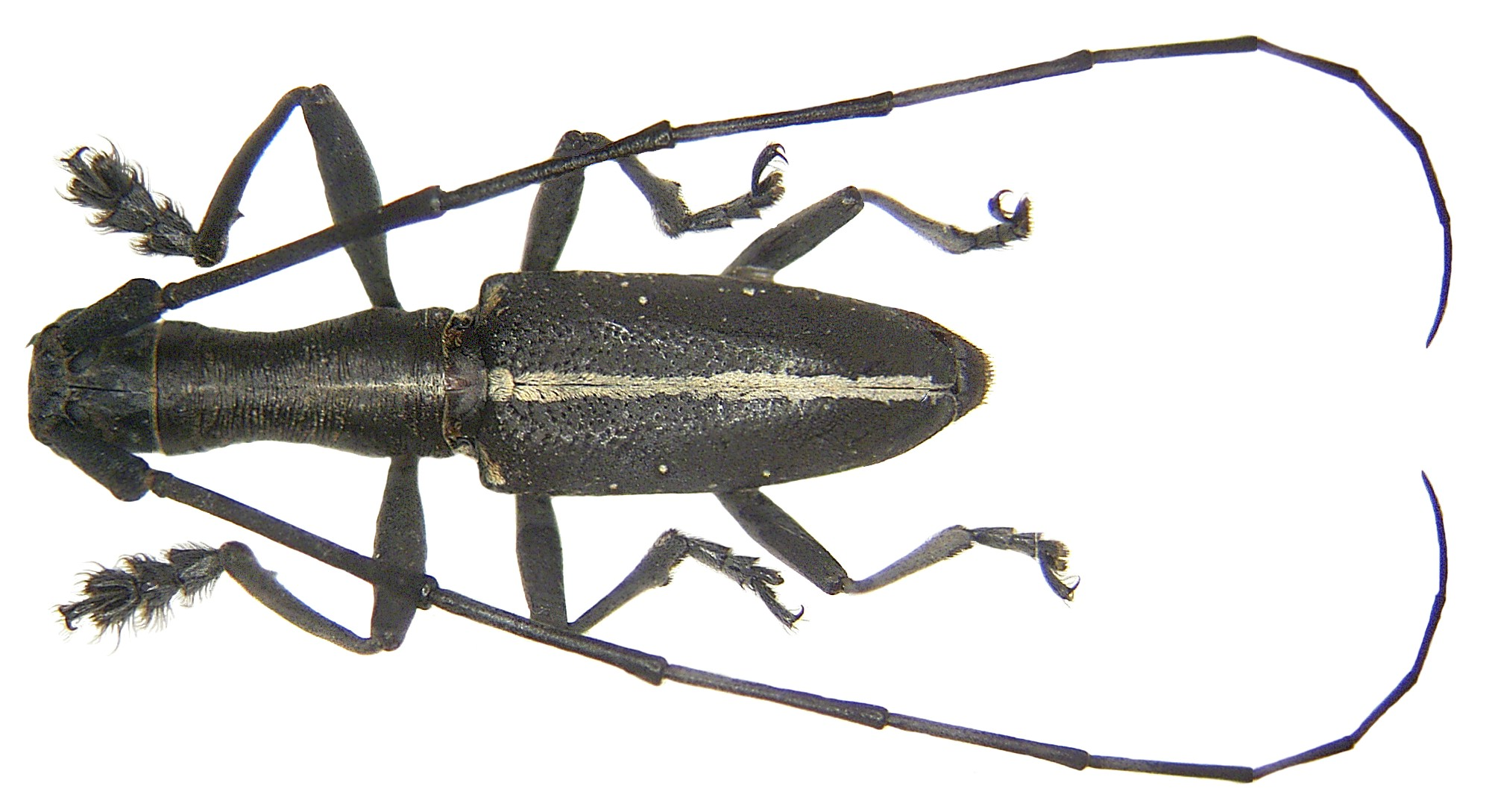
- Gnoma suturalis

Scientific classification
- Kingdom: Animalia
- Phylum: Arthropoda
- Clade: Pancrustacea
- Class: Insecta
- Order: Coleoptera
- Suborder: Polyphaga
- Infraorder: Cucujiformia
- Family: Cerambycidae
- Tribe: Lamiini
- Genus: Gnoma
- Species: G. suturalis

Binomial name
- Gnoma suturalis Westwood, 1832

Synonyms
- Gnoma agroides Thomson, 19860

= Gnoma suturalis =

Species of beetle

Gnoma suturalis is a species of beetle in the family Cerambycidae. It was described by John O. Westwood in 1832. It is known from Sulawesi and the Moluccas.
