= Gnoma admirala =

Scientific classification
- Kingdom: Animalia
- Phylum: Arthropoda
- Class: Insecta
- Order: Coleoptera
- Suborder: Polyphaga
- Infraorder: Cucujiformia
- Family: Cerambycidae
- Genus: Gnoma
- Species: G. admirala

Binomial name
- Gnoma admirala Dillon & Dillon, 1951

Species of beetle

Gnoma admirala is a species of beetle in the family Cerambycidae. It was described by Dillon and Dillon in 1951.

== Subspecies ==
- Gnoma admirala admirala Dillon & Dillon, 1951
- Gnoma admirala pallida Dillon & Dillon, 1951
