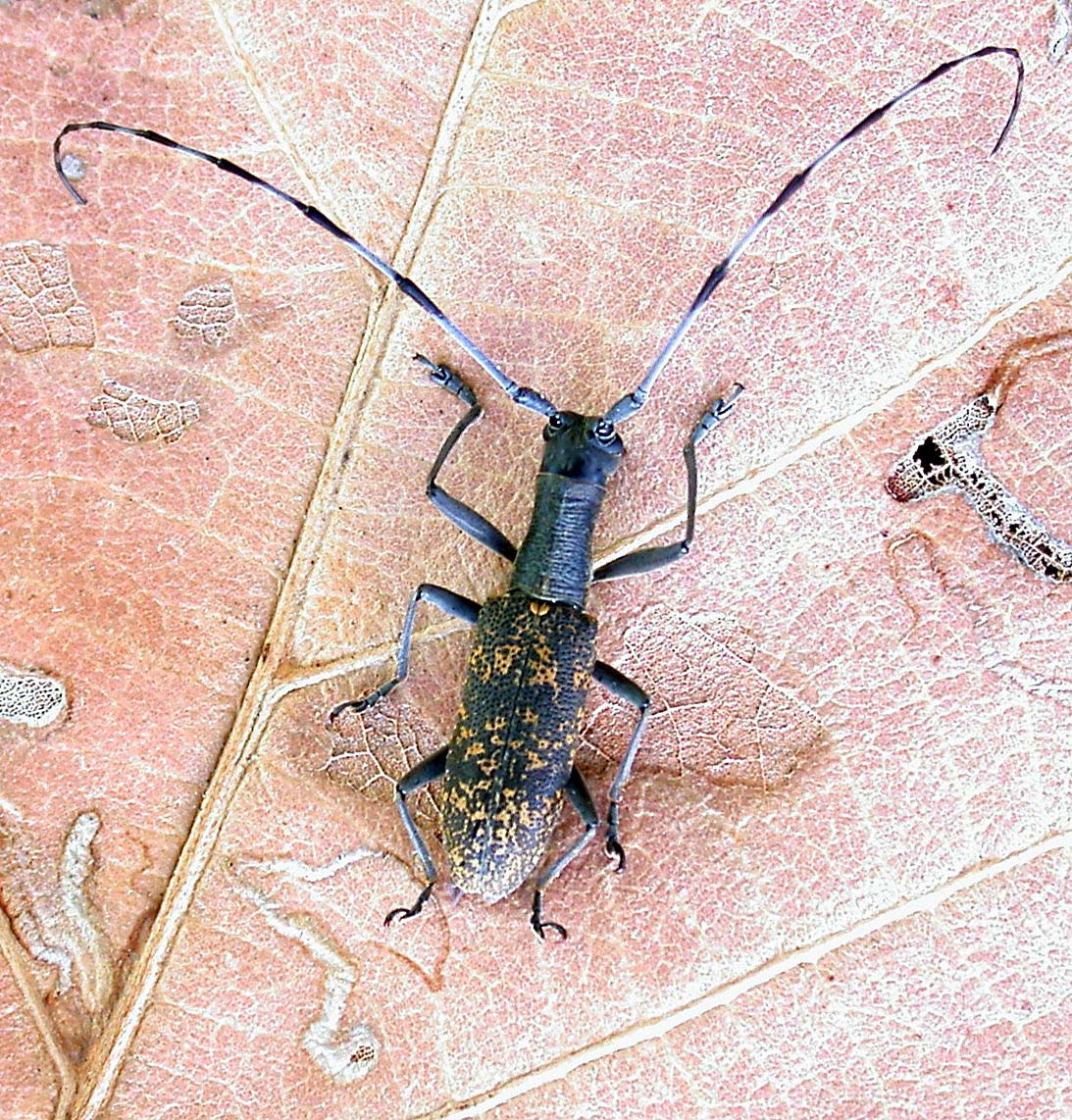
- Gnoma atomaria female

Scientific classification
- Kingdom: Animalia
- Phylum: Arthropoda
- Class: Insecta
- Order: Coleoptera
- Suborder: Polyphaga
- Infraorder: Cucujiformia
- Family: Cerambycidae
- Genus: Gnoma
- Species: G. atomaria

Binomial name
- Gnoma atomaria Guérin de Méneville, 1834

Synonyms
- Gnoma longicollis (Fabricius) Schwarzer, 1926

= Gnoma atomaria =

Species of beetle

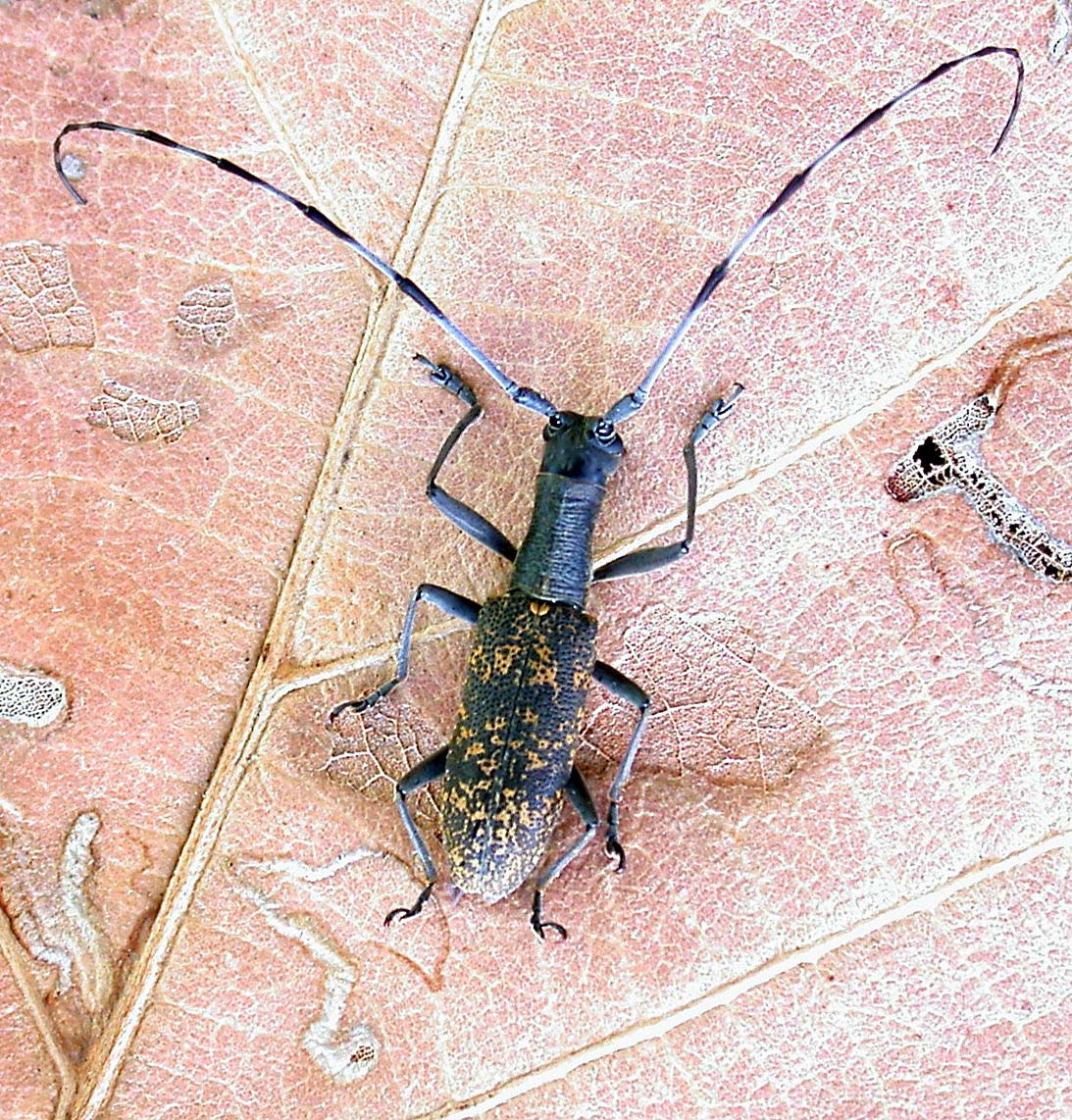
Gnoma atomaria

Gnoma atomaria is a species of beetle in the family Cerambycidae. It was described by Guérin de Méneville in 1834. It is known from India.
