= Gnoma thomsoni =

Scientific classification
- Kingdom: Animalia
- Phylum: Arthropoda
- Class: Insecta
- Order: Coleoptera
- Suborder: Polyphaga
- Infraorder: Cucujiformia
- Family: Cerambycidae
- Genus: Gnoma
- Species: G. thomsoni

Binomial name
- Gnoma thomsoni Dillon & Dillon, 1951

Species of beetle

Gnoma thomsoni is a species of beetle in the family Cerambycidae. It was described by Dillon and Dillon in 1951.
