= Gnoma minor =

Scientific classification
- Kingdom: Animalia
- Phylum: Arthropoda
- Class: Insecta
- Order: Coleoptera
- Suborder: Polyphaga
- Infraorder: Cucujiformia
- Family: Cerambycidae
- Genus: Gnoma
- Species: G. minor

Binomial name
- Gnoma minor Gressitt, 1952

Species of beetle

Gnoma minor is a species of beetle in the family Cerambycidae. It was described by Gressitt in 1952.
