= Gnoma malasiaca =

Scientific classification
- Kingdom: Animalia
- Phylum: Arthropoda
- Class: Insecta
- Order: Coleoptera
- Suborder: Polyphaga
- Infraorder: Cucujiformia
- Family: Cerambycidae
- Genus: Gnoma
- Species: G. malasiaca

Binomial name
- Gnoma malasiaca Breuning, 1983

Species of beetle

Gnoma malasiaca is a species of beetle in the family Cerambycidae. It was described by Stephan von Breuning in 1983.
