= Gnoma suturifera =

Scientific classification
- Kingdom: Animalia
- Phylum: Arthropoda
- Class: Insecta
- Order: Coleoptera
- Suborder: Polyphaga
- Infraorder: Cucujiformia
- Family: Cerambycidae
- Genus: Gnoma
- Species: G. suturifera

Binomial name
- Gnoma suturifera Schwarzer, 1929

Species of beetle

Gnoma suturifera is a species of beetle in the family Cerambycidae. It was described by Schwarzer in 1929. It is known from the Philippines.

== Subspecies ==
- Gnoma suturifera fasciata Dillon & Dillon, 1950
- Gnoma suturifera suturifera Schwarzer, 1929
