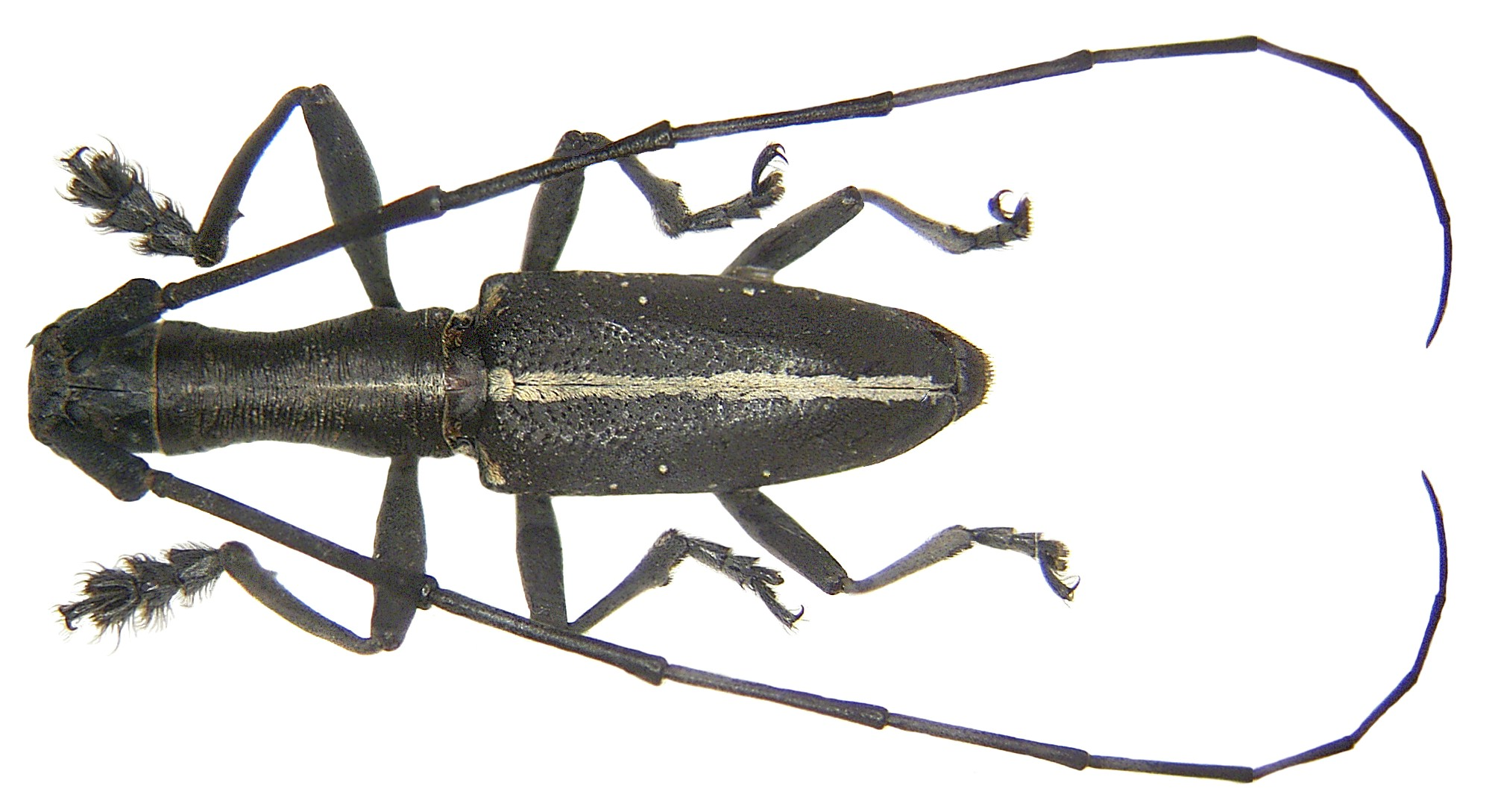
- Gnoma suturalis

Scientific classification
- Kingdom: Animalia
- Phylum: Arthropoda
- Class: Insecta
- Order: Coleoptera
- Suborder: Polyphaga
- Infraorder: Cucujiformia
- Family: Cerambycidae
- Subfamily: Lamiinae
- Tribe: Lamiini
- Genus: Gnoma; Fabricius, 1801

= Gnoma =

Genus of beetles

Gnoma is a genus of longhorn beetles of the subfamily Lamiinae, containing the following species:

- Gnoma admirala Dillon & Dillon, 1951
- Gnoma affinis Boisduval, 1835
- Gnoma agroides Thomson, 1860
- Gnoma atomaria Guérin de Méneville, 1834
- Gnoma australis Schwarzer, 1926
- Gnoma blanchardi Breuning, 1945
- Gnoma boisduvali Plavilstshikov, 1931
- Gnoma confusa J. Thomson, 1865
- Gnoma geelvinka Dillon & Dillon, 1951
- Gnoma gilmouri Dillon & Dillon, 1951
- Gnoma jugalis Newman, 1842
- Gnoma longicollis (Fabricius, 1787)
- Gnoma luzonica Erichson, 1834
- Gnoma malasiaca Breuning, 1983
- Gnoma minor Gressitt, 1952
- Gnoma nicobarica Breuning, 1936
- Gnoma pseudosuturalis Schwarzer, 1926
- Gnoma pulvurea Pascoe, 1866
- Gnoma sticticollis Thomson, 1857
- Gnoma subfasciata Thomson, 1865
- Gnoma suturalis Westwood, 1832
- Gnoma suturifera Schwarzer, 1929
- Gnoma thomsoni Dillon & Dillon, 1951
- Gnoma uniformis Dillon & Dillon, 1951
- Gnoma vittaticollis Aurivillius, 1923
- Gnoma zonaria (Linnaeus, 1758)
