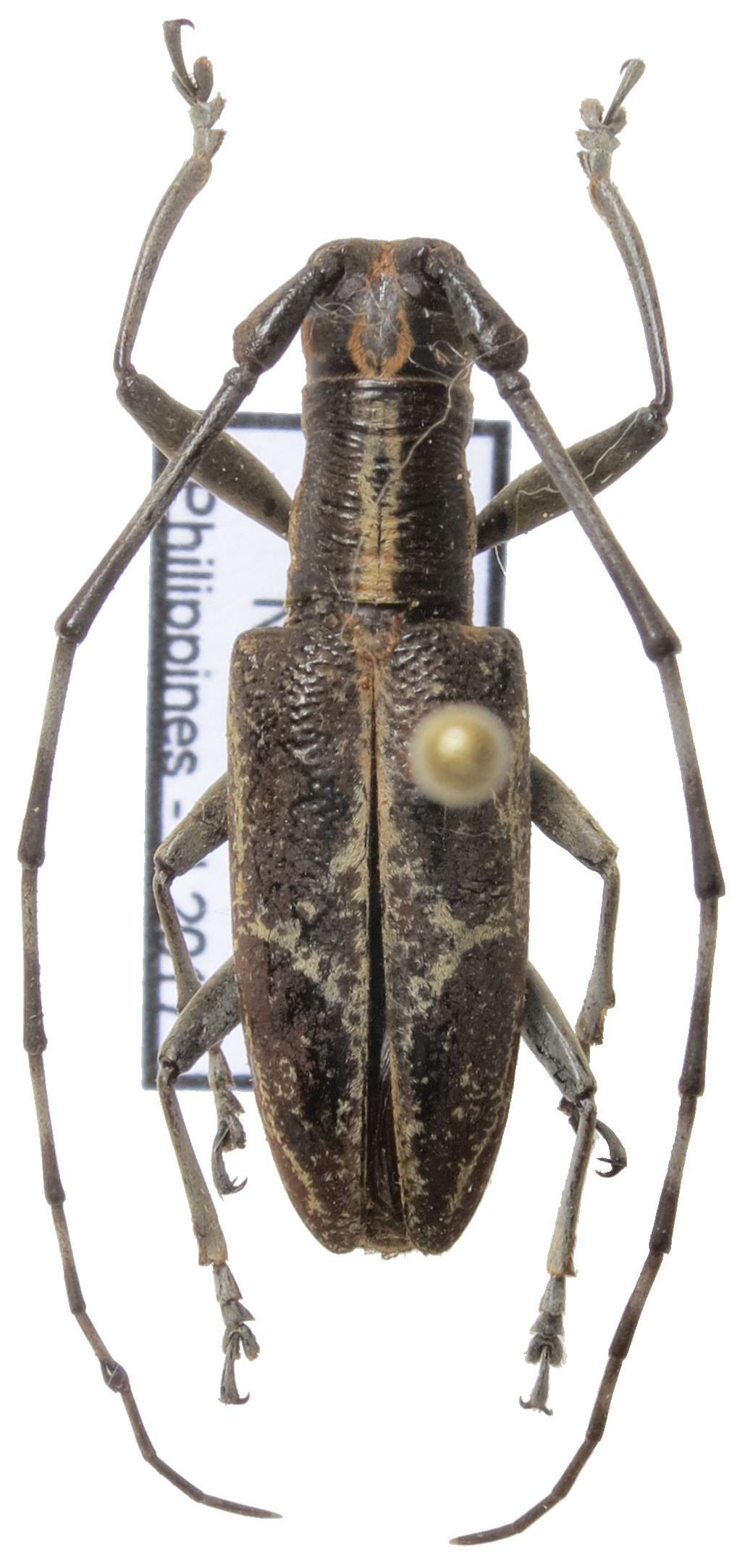
- From north Luzon, Philippines

Scientific classification
- Kingdom: Animalia
- Phylum: Arthropoda
- Class: Insecta
- Order: Coleoptera
- Suborder: Polyphaga
- Infraorder: Cucujiformia
- Family: Cerambycidae
- Genus: Gnoma
- Species: G. luzonica

Binomial name
- Gnoma luzonica Erichson, 1834

Synonyms
- Gnoma luzonicum Erichson, 1834

= Gnoma luzonica =

Species of beetle

Gnoma luzonica is a species of beetle in the family Cerambycidae. It was described by Wilhelm Ferdinand Erichson in 1834, originally as G. luzonicum. It is known from the Philippines.

== Subspecies ==
- Gnoma luzonica bilara Dillon & Dillon, 1950
- Gnoma luzonica luzonica Erichson, 1834
- Gnoma luzonica transiens Kriesche, 1936
