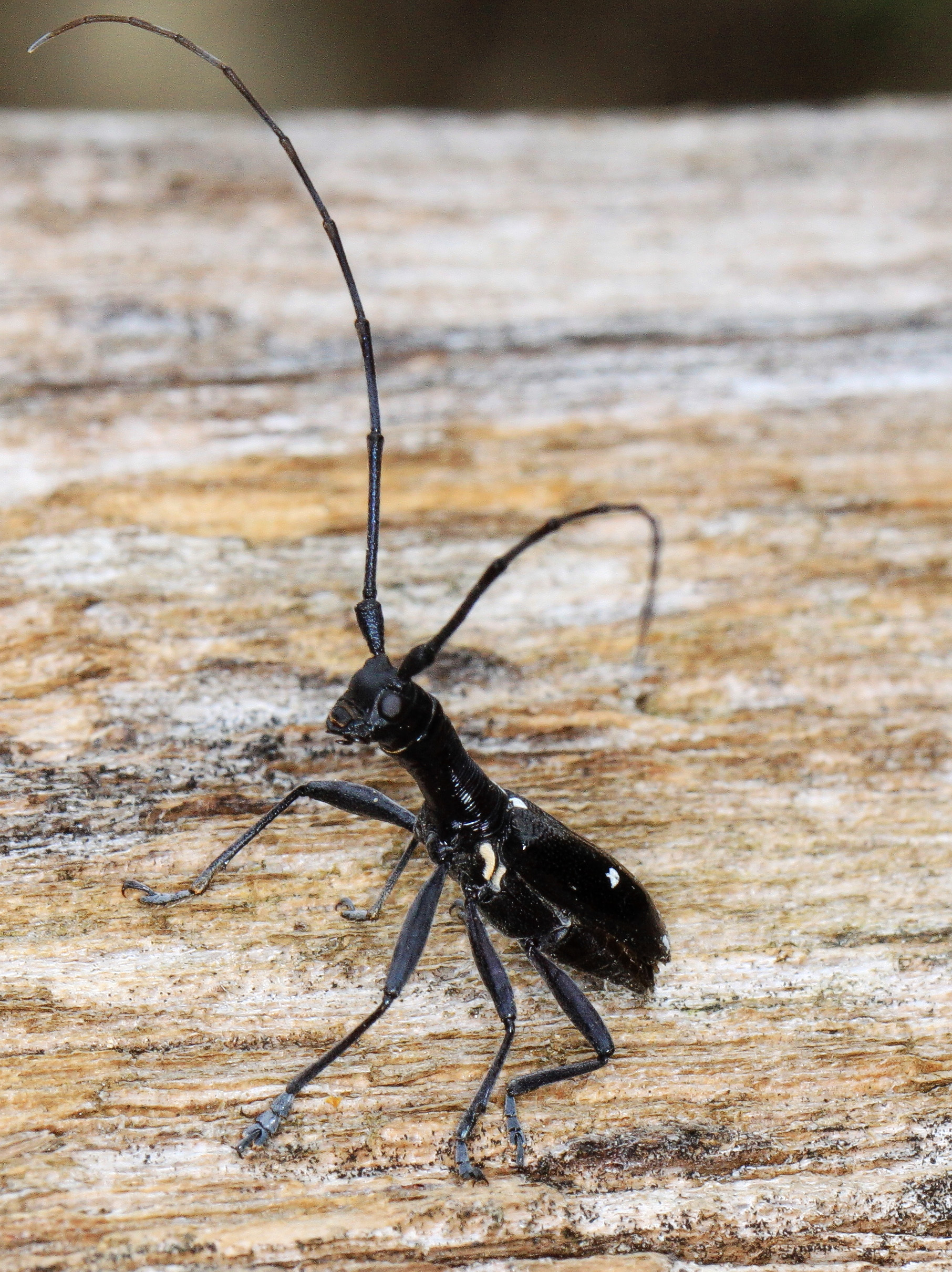

Scientific classification
- Kingdom: Animalia
- Phylum: Arthropoda
- Class: Insecta
- Order: Coleoptera
- Suborder: Polyphaga
- Infraorder: Cucujiformia
- Family: Cerambycidae
- Genus: Gnoma
- Species: G. affinis

Binomial name
- Gnoma affinis Boisduval, 1835

Synonyms
- Gnoma blanchardi Breuning, 1945; Gnoma ctenostomoides Thomson, 1860; Gnoma albotesselata (Blanchard) Pascoe, 1866; Gnoma longicollis (Fabricius, 1787)

= Gnoma affinis =

Species of beetle

Gnoma affinis is a species of beetle in the family Cerambycidae. It was described by Jean Baptiste Boisduval in 1835. It is known from Papua New Guinea.
