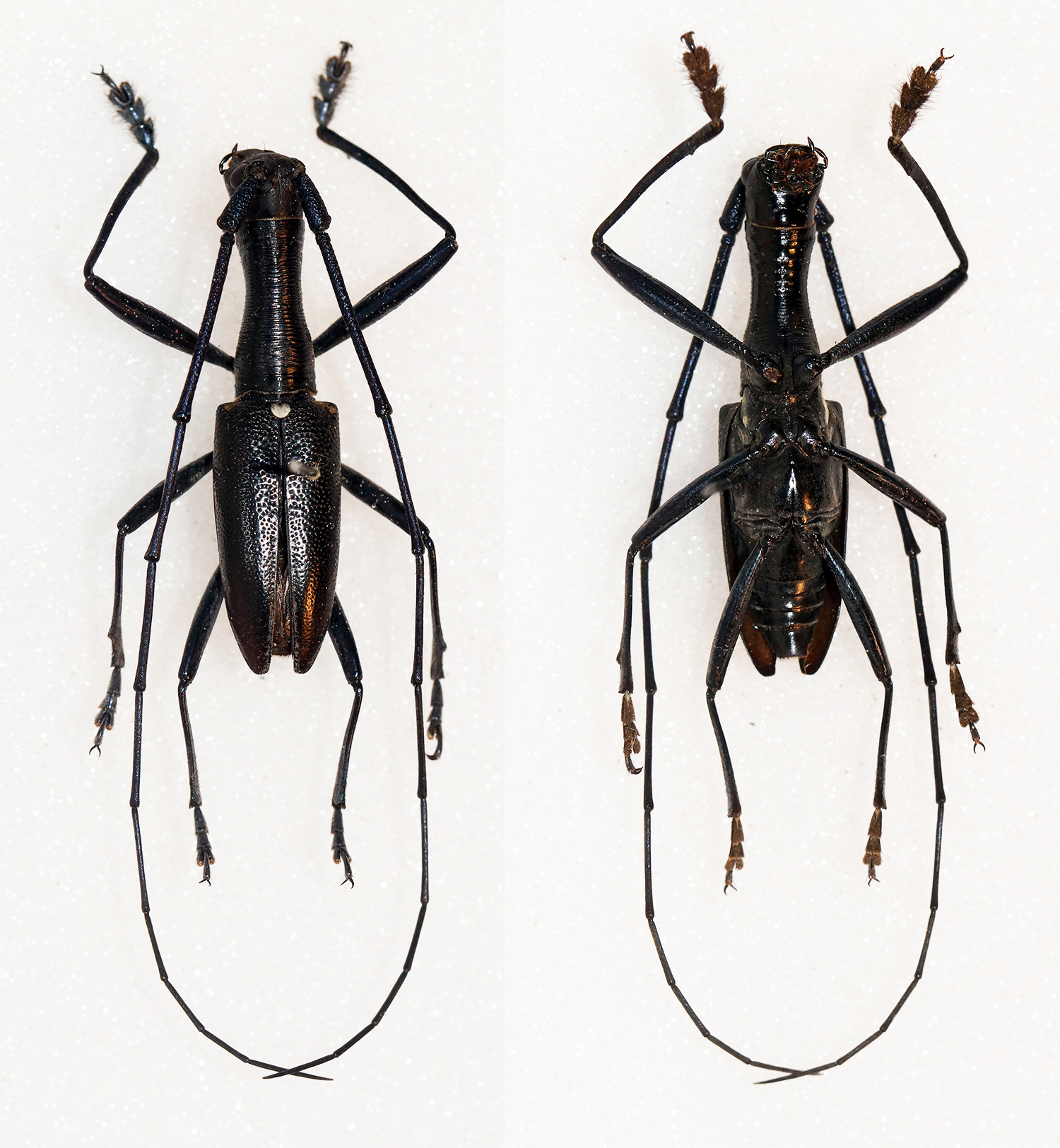

Scientific classification
- Kingdom: Animalia
- Phylum: Arthropoda
- Clade: Pancrustacea
- Class: Insecta
- Order: Coleoptera
- Suborder: Polyphaga
- Infraorder: Cucujiformia
- Family: Cerambycidae
- Genus: Gnoma
- Species: G. pulvurea

Binomial name
- Gnoma pulvurea Pascoe, 1866

= Gnoma pulvurea =

Species of beetle

Gnoma pulvurea is a species of beetle in the family Cerambycidae found in Asia in countries such as Sulawesi.
