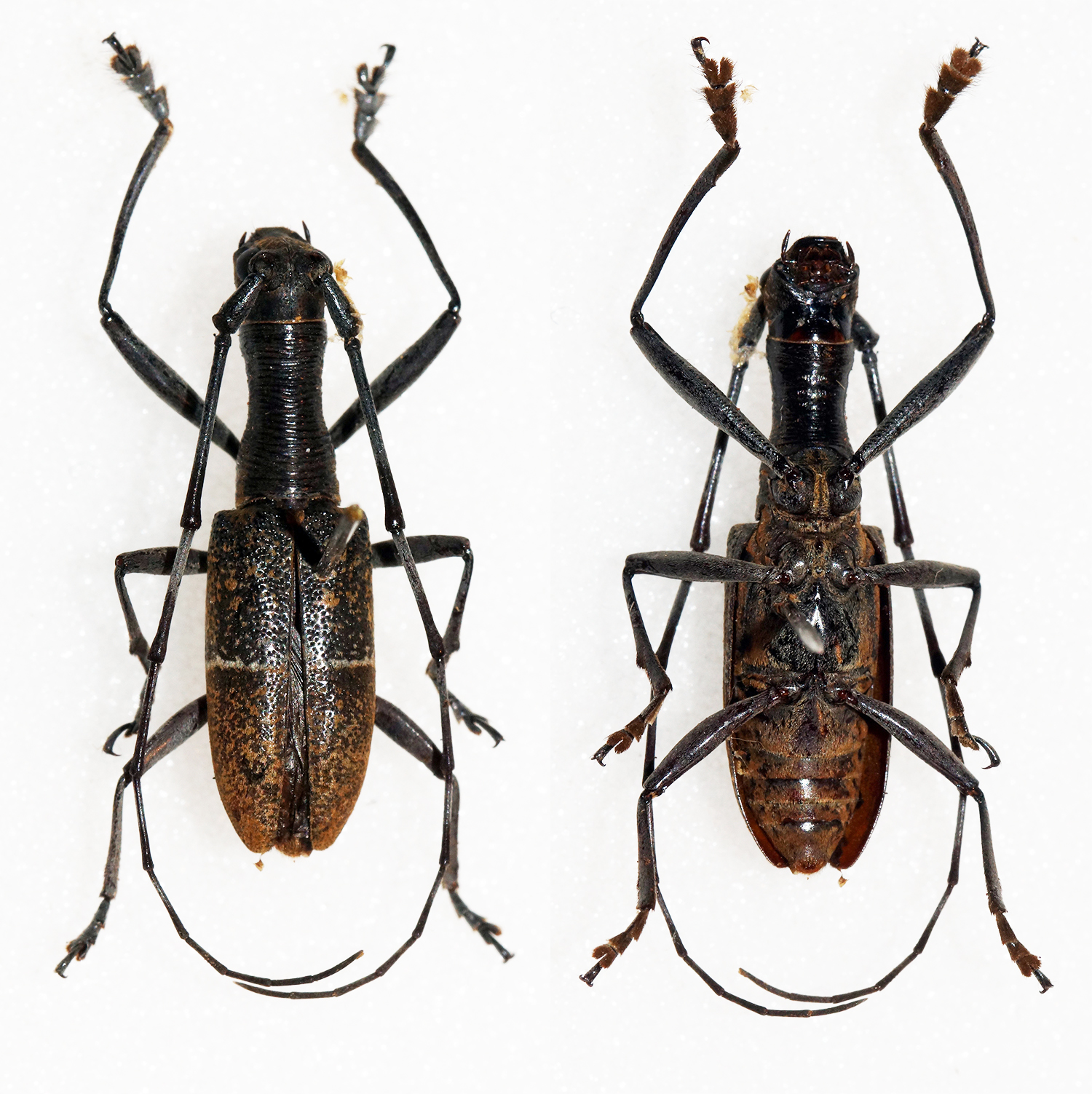

Scientific classification
- Kingdom: Animalia
- Phylum: Arthropoda
- Class: Insecta
- Order: Coleoptera
- Suborder: Polyphaga
- Infraorder: Cucujiformia
- Family: Cerambycidae
- Genus: Gnoma
- Species: G. jugalis

Binomial name
- Gnoma jugalis Newman, 1842

= Gnoma jugalis =

Species of beetle

Gnoma jugalis is a species of beetle in the family of Cerambycidae. It was first described by Newman in 1842. It is known from the Philippines.

== Subspecies ==
- Gnoma jugalis jugalis Newman, 1842
- Gnoma jugalis meridionalis Schwarzer, 1929
- Gnoma jugalis samar Dillon & Dillon, 1951
