= Gnoma boisduvali =

Scientific classification
- Kingdom: Animalia
- Phylum: Arthropoda
- Class: Insecta
- Order: Coleoptera
- Suborder: Polyphaga
- Infraorder: Cucujiformia
- Family: Cerambycidae
- Genus: Gnoma
- Species: G. boisduvali

Binomial name
- Gnoma boisduvali Plavilstshikov, 1931

Synonyms
- Gnoma giraffa (Schreiber) Boisduval, 1835

Species of beetle

Gnoma boisduvali is a species of beetle in the family Cerambycidae. It was described by Plavilstshikov in 1931. It is known from Papua New Guinea.
