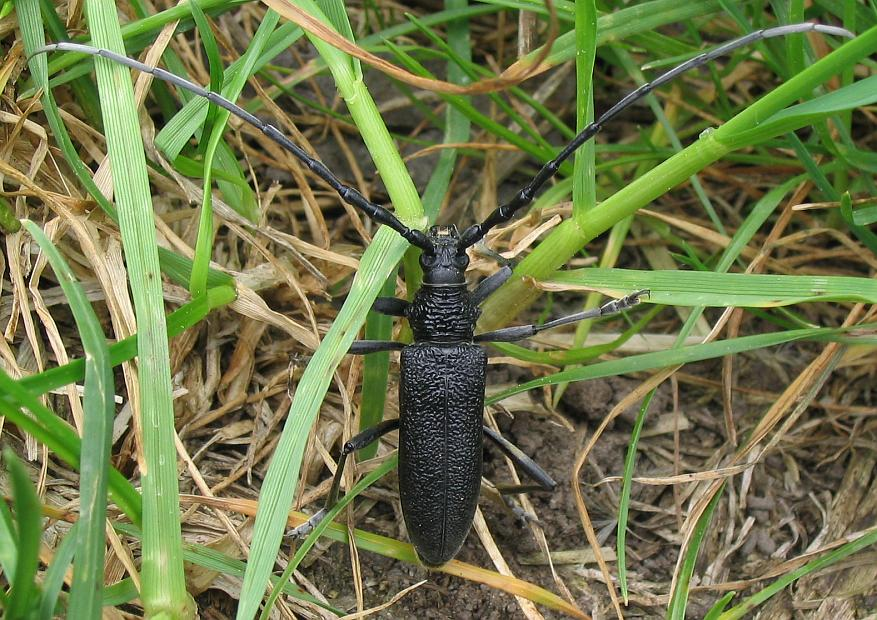

Scientific classification
- Domain: Eukaryota
- Kingdom: Animalia
- Phylum: Arthropoda
- Class: Insecta
- Order: Coleoptera
- Suborder: Polyphaga
- Infraorder: Cucujiformia
- Family: Cerambycidae
- Genus: Cerambyx
- Species: C. scopolii

Binomial name
- Cerambyx scopolii Fuessly, 1775

= Cerambyx scopolii =

Species of beetle

Cerambyx scopolii is species of longhorn beetle native to Europe. Its wood-boring larvae will grow in oak, willow, and chestnut, and in sufficient density can kill a tree.
