= Gnoma longicollis =

Scientific classification
- Kingdom: Animalia
- Phylum: Arthropoda
- Clade: Pancrustacea
- Class: Insecta
- Order: Coleoptera
- Suborder: Polyphaga
- Infraorder: Cucujiformia
- Family: Cerambycidae
- Genus: Gnoma
- Species: G. longicollis

Binomial name
- Gnoma longicollis (Fabricius, 1787)

Synonyms
- Cerambyx longicollis Fabricius, 1787 nec DeGeer, 1775; Gnoma casnonioides J. Thomson, 1860; Gnoma confusa J. Thomson, 1865; Gnoma longitarsis Pascoe, 1866; Gnoma sublaevifrons Schwarzer, 1926; Gnoma sumatrensis Dillon & Dillon, 1951

Species of beetle

Gnoma longicollis is a species of beetle in the family Cerambycidae. It was described by Johan Christian Fabricius in 1787 originally under the genus Cerambyx. It is known from Malaysia, Borneo, Singapore, India and Sumatra.
