= Gnoma pseudosuturalis =

Scientific classification
- Kingdom: Animalia
- Phylum: Arthropoda
- Clade: Pancrustacea
- Class: Insecta
- Order: Coleoptera
- Suborder: Polyphaga
- Infraorder: Cucujiformia
- Family: Cerambycidae
- Genus: Gnoma
- Species: G. pseudosuturalis

Binomial name
- Gnoma pseudosuturalis Schwarzer, 1926

Species of beetle

Gnoma pseudosuturalis is a species of beetle in the family Cerambycidae. It was described by Schwarzer in 1926. It is known from Sulawesi.
