= Gnoma vittaticollis =

Scientific classification
- Kingdom: Animalia
- Phylum: Arthropoda
- Class: Insecta
- Order: Coleoptera
- Suborder: Polyphaga
- Infraorder: Cucujiformia
- Family: Cerambycidae
- Genus: Gnoma
- Species: G. vittaticollis

Binomial name
- Gnoma vittaticollis Aurivillius, 1923

Species of beetle

Gnoma vittaticollis is a species of beetle in the family Cerambycidae. It was described by Per Olof Christopher Aurivillius in 1923. It is known from Borneo and the Philippines.
