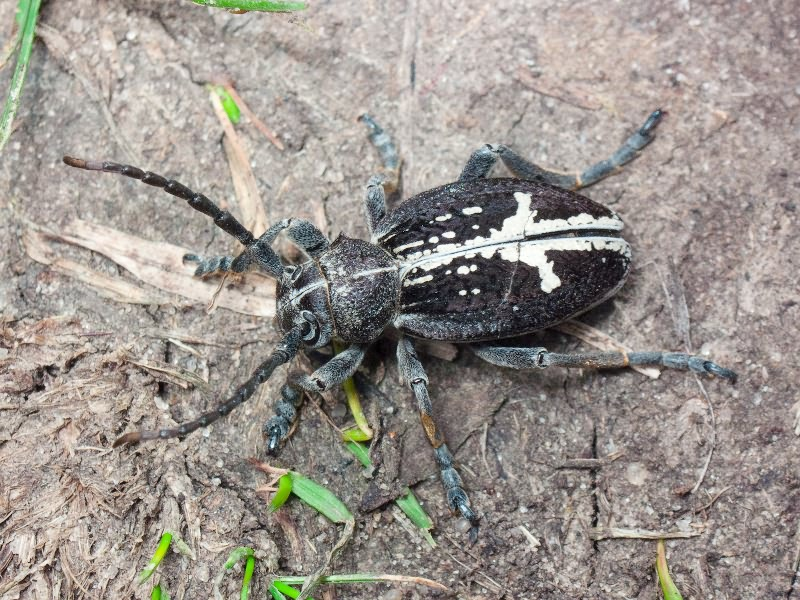

Scientific classification
- Kingdom: Animalia
- Phylum: Arthropoda
- Clade: Pancrustacea
- Class: Insecta
- Order: Coleoptera
- Suborder: Polyphaga
- Infraorder: Cucujiformia
- Family: Cerambycidae
- Genus: Dorcadion
- Species: D. equestre

Binomial name
- Dorcadion equestre (Laxmann, 1770)

Synonyms
- Cerambyx crucifer Lepechin, 1774; Cerambyx equestris Laxmann, 1770; Pedestredorcadion equestre (Laxmann) Sama, 2002

= Dorcadion equestre =

Species of beetle

Dorcadion equestre is a species of beetle in the family Cerambycidae. It was first described by Laxmann in 1770, under the genus Cerambyx. This species is found in Greece, Bulgaria, Hungary, Serbia, Romania, North Macedonia, Turkey, Russia, Moldova, Albania, and Ukraine.

== Subspecies ==
- Dorcadion equestre equestre (Laxmann, 1770)
- Dorcadion equestre nogelii Fairmaire, 1866
- Dorcadion equestre reclinatum Kraatz, 1892
- Dorcadion equestre transsilvanicum Ganglbauer, 1884
