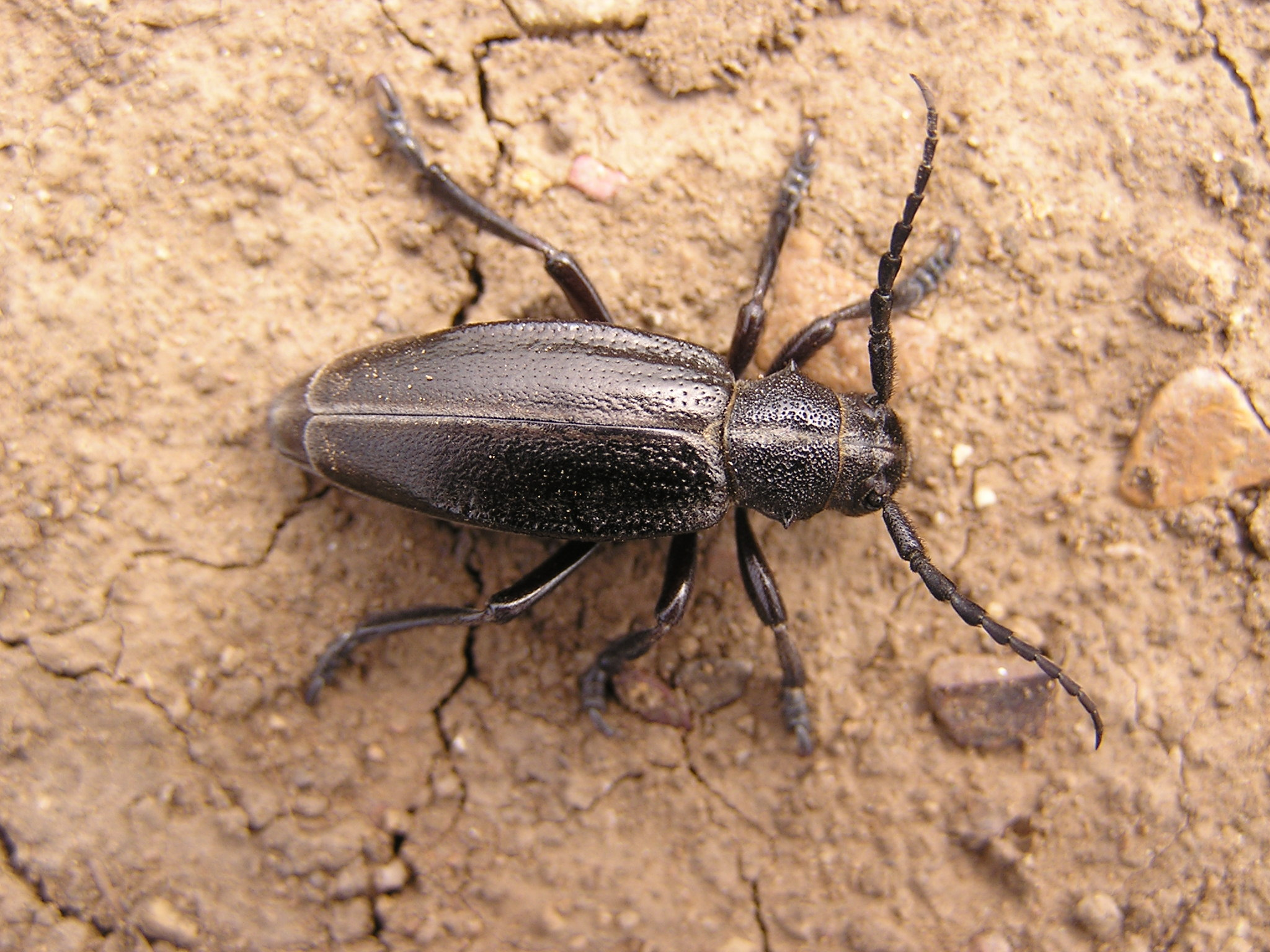

Scientific classification
- Kingdom: Animalia
- Phylum: Arthropoda
- Clade: Pancrustacea
- Class: Insecta
- Order: Coleoptera
- Suborder: Polyphaga
- Infraorder: Cucujiformia
- Family: Cerambycidae
- Genus: Dorcadion
- Species: D. carinatum

Binomial name
- Dorcadion carinatum (Pallas, 1771)

Synonyms
- Carinatodorcadion carinatum (Pallas) Sama, 2002; Cerambyx carinatus Pallas, 1771; Dorcadion morio Fischer-Waldheim, 1824 nec Fabricius; Dorcadion pigrum (Schönherr) Küster, 1847; Lamia pigra Schönherr, 1817

= Dorcadion carinatum =

Species of beetle

Dorcadion carinatum is a species of beetle in the family Cerambycidae. It was described by Peter Simon Pallas in 1771, originally under the genus Cerambyx. It is known from Russia, Azerbaijan, Kazakhstan, Georgia, and Ukraine.

== Subspecies ==
- Dorcadion carinatum carinatum (Pallas, 1771)
- Dorcadion carinatum cylindraceum Reitter, 1886
- Dorcadion carinatum igrenum Danilevsky, 1998
- Dorcadion carinatum sunzhenum Danilevsky, 1998
- Dorcadion carinatum uralense Danilevsky, 1998

== See also ==
Dorcadion
