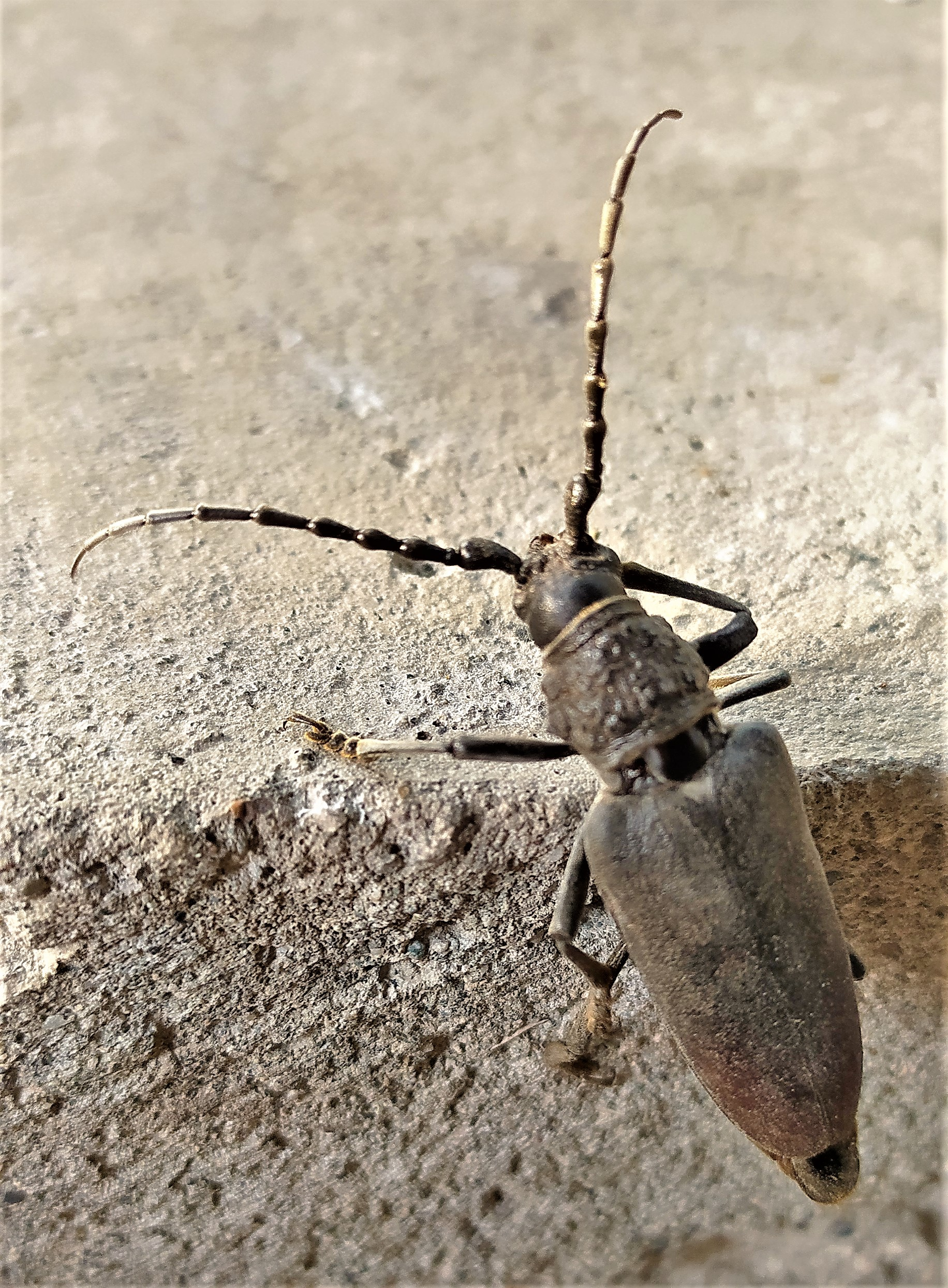

Conservation status
- Vulnerable (IUCN 3.1)

Scientific classification
- Kingdom: Animalia
- Phylum: Arthropoda
- Class: Insecta
- Order: Coleoptera
- Suborder: Polyphaga
- Infraorder: Cucujiformia
- Family: Cerambycidae
- Genus: Cerambyx
- Species: C. cerdo

Binomial name
- Cerambyx cerdo Linnaeus, 1758
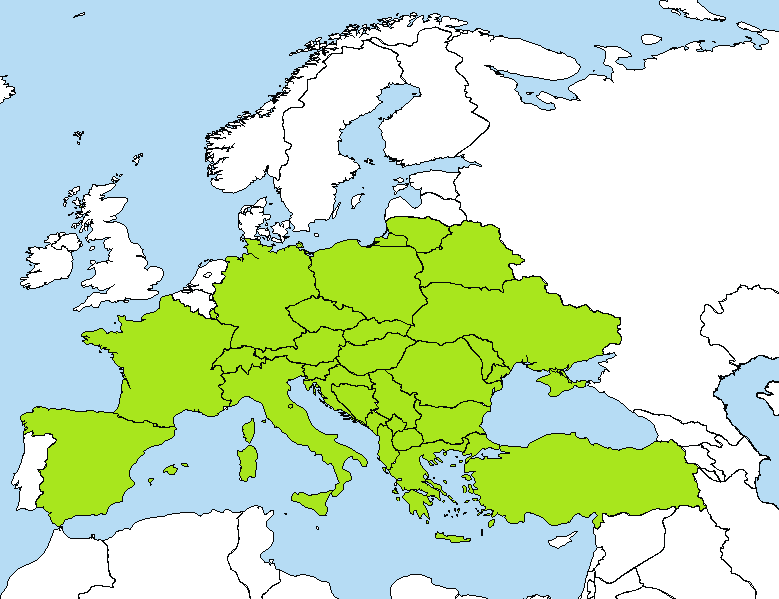
- European distribution of C. cerdo

Synonyms
- Cerambyx acuminatus; Hammaticherus pfisteri

= Cerambyx cerdo =

Species of beetle

Cerambyx cerdo, commonly known as the great capricorn beetle or cerambyx longicorn, is a species of beetle in family Cerambycidae. It occurs in North Africa (Algeria, Morocco, and Tunisia), Europe (Austria, Belarus, Bulgaria, Croatia, the Czech Republic, North Macedonia, France, Georgia, Germany, Hungary, Italy, Moldova, Poland, Portugal, Romania, Russia, Serbia, Slovakia, Spain, Sweden, Switzerland, and Ukraine), and West Asia (Armenia, Azerbaijan, Georgia, Iran, and Turkey).

The beetle was previously present in the United Kingdom but went locally extinct at least hundreds of years ago. Preserved specimens have been found in the UK, having been dated to around 4000 years old. It has been recorded in the UK since, but this is believed to be because of accidental human introduction due to wood transport.

== Description ==
This beetle measures between 41 and 55 mm in body length and is among the largest of the European beetle species. It has an elongated, robust body and, like all members of the longhorn family, it has long antennae. In males, these thread-like antennae are longer than the body, but in females they are only as long as the hard wing cases (the elytra). The legs and body are black, except for the elytra which are reddish-brown towards the tips.

== Photogallery ==
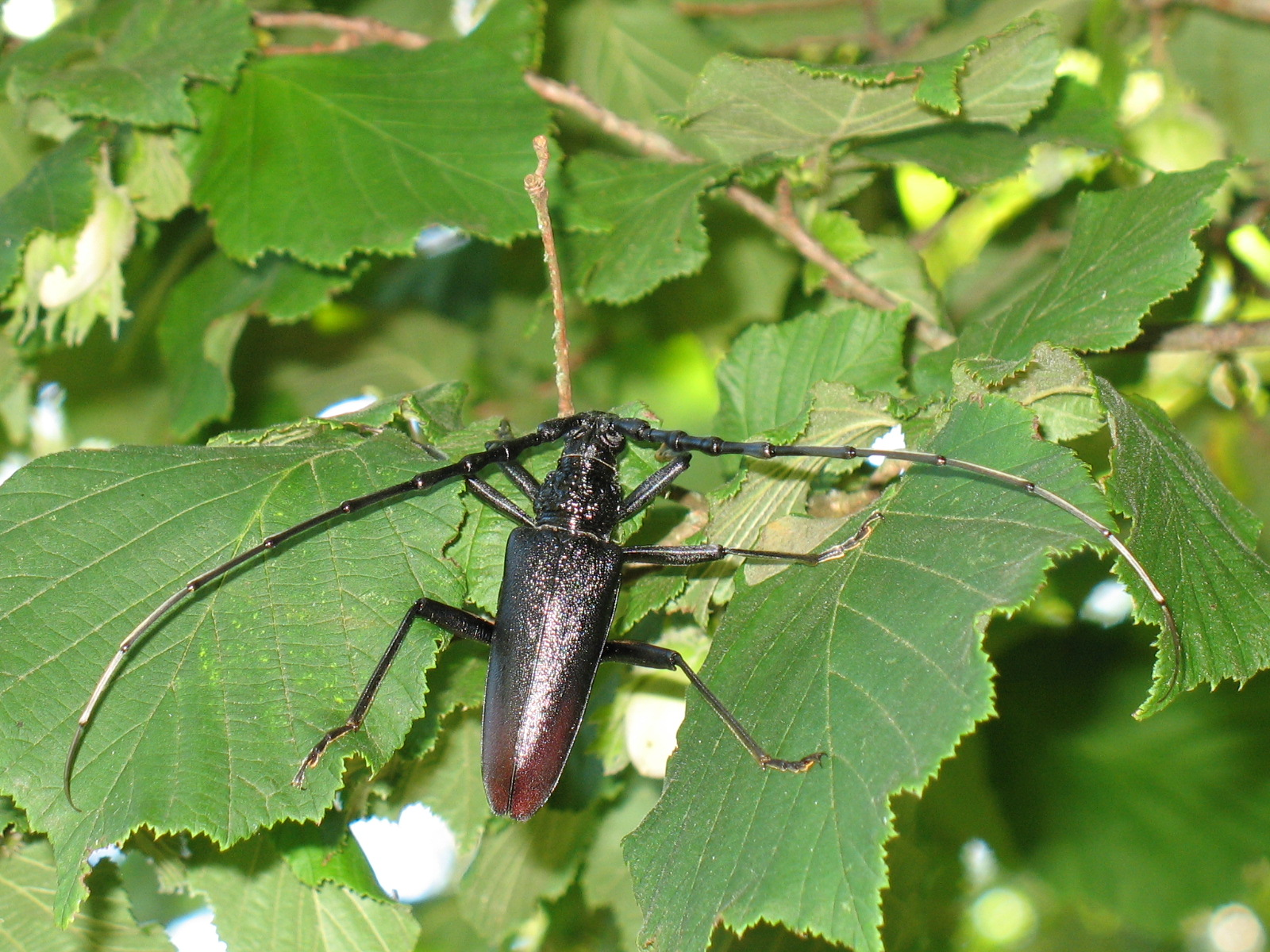
Male specimen

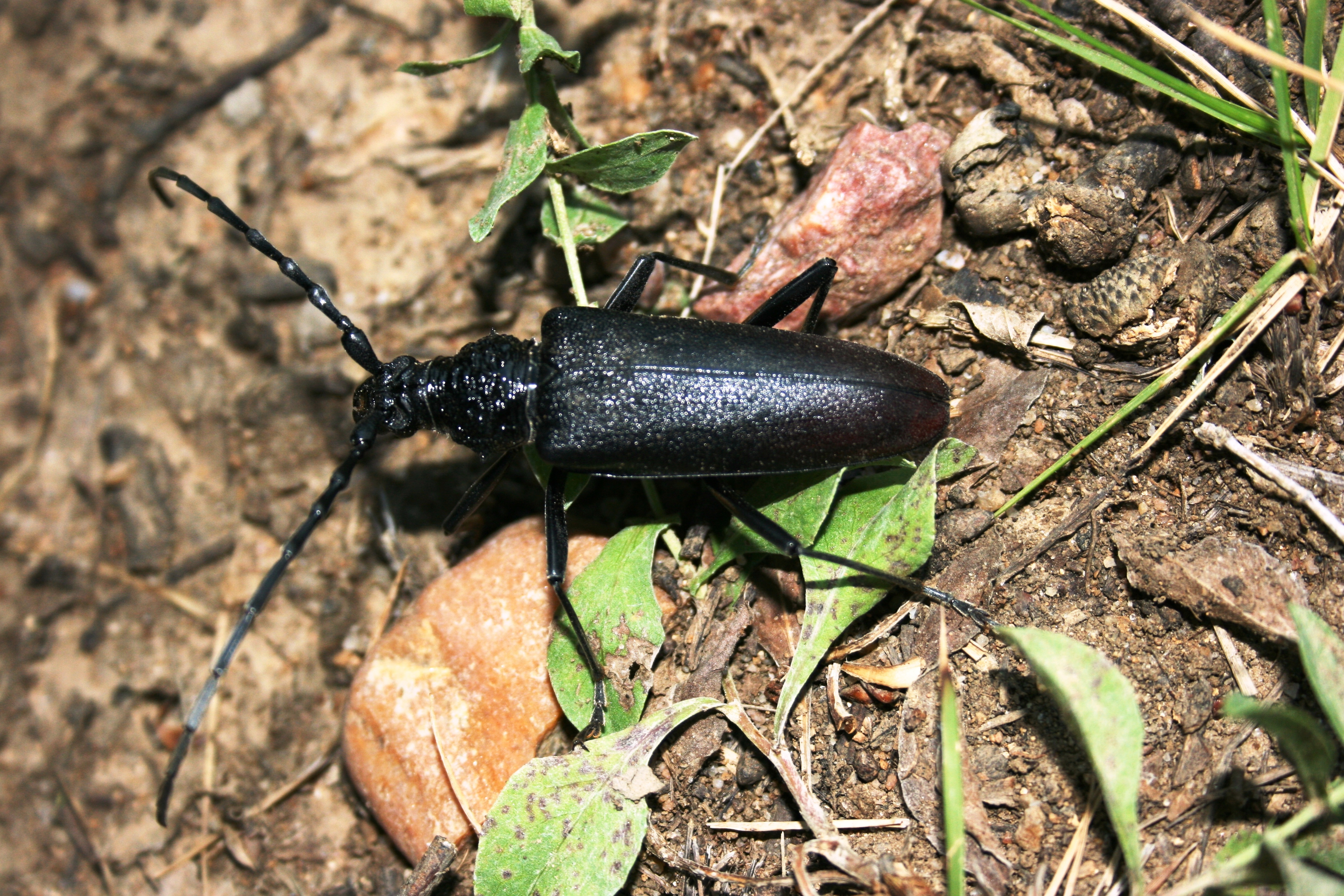
Female specimen

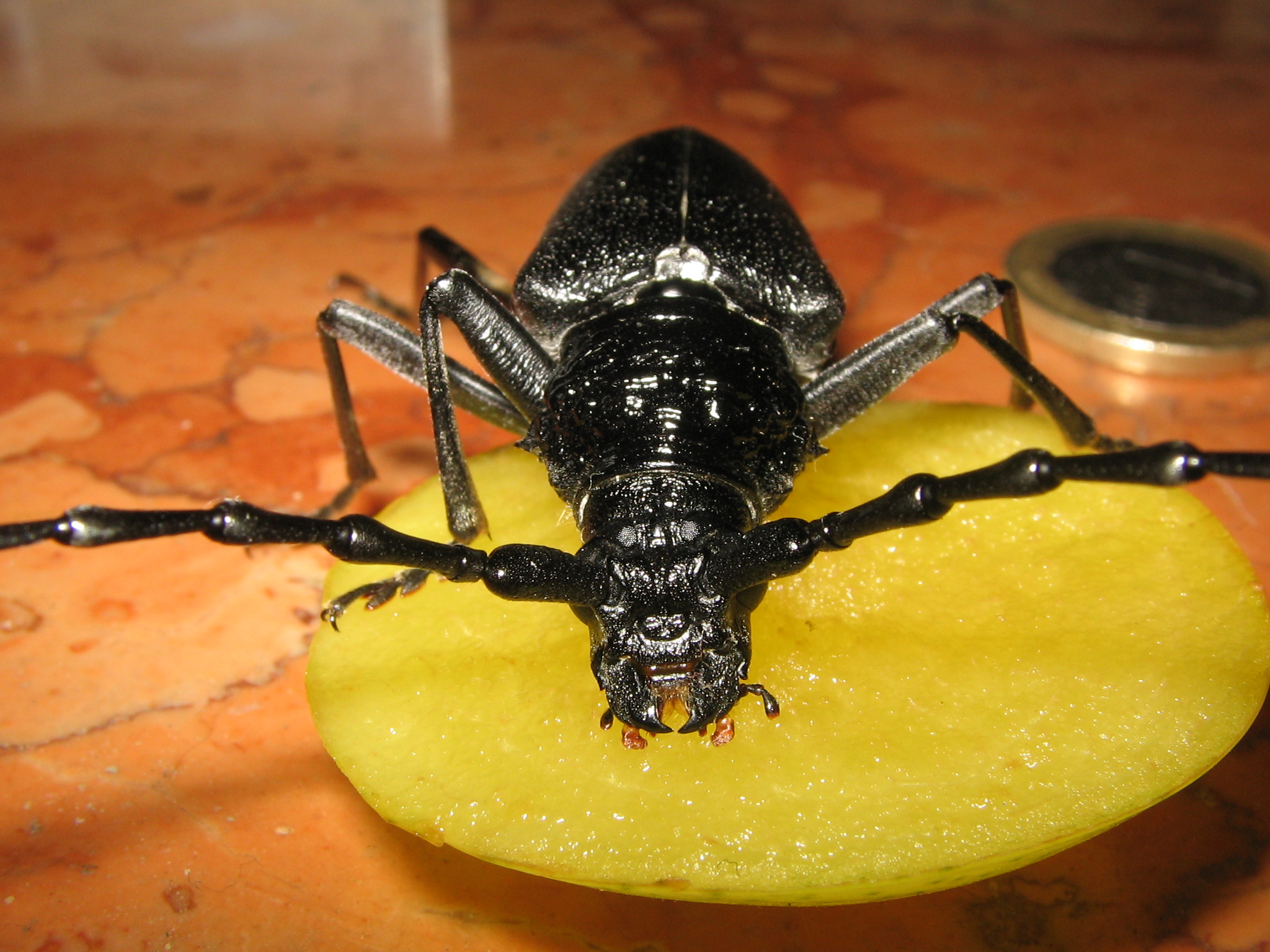
Front view of a female
