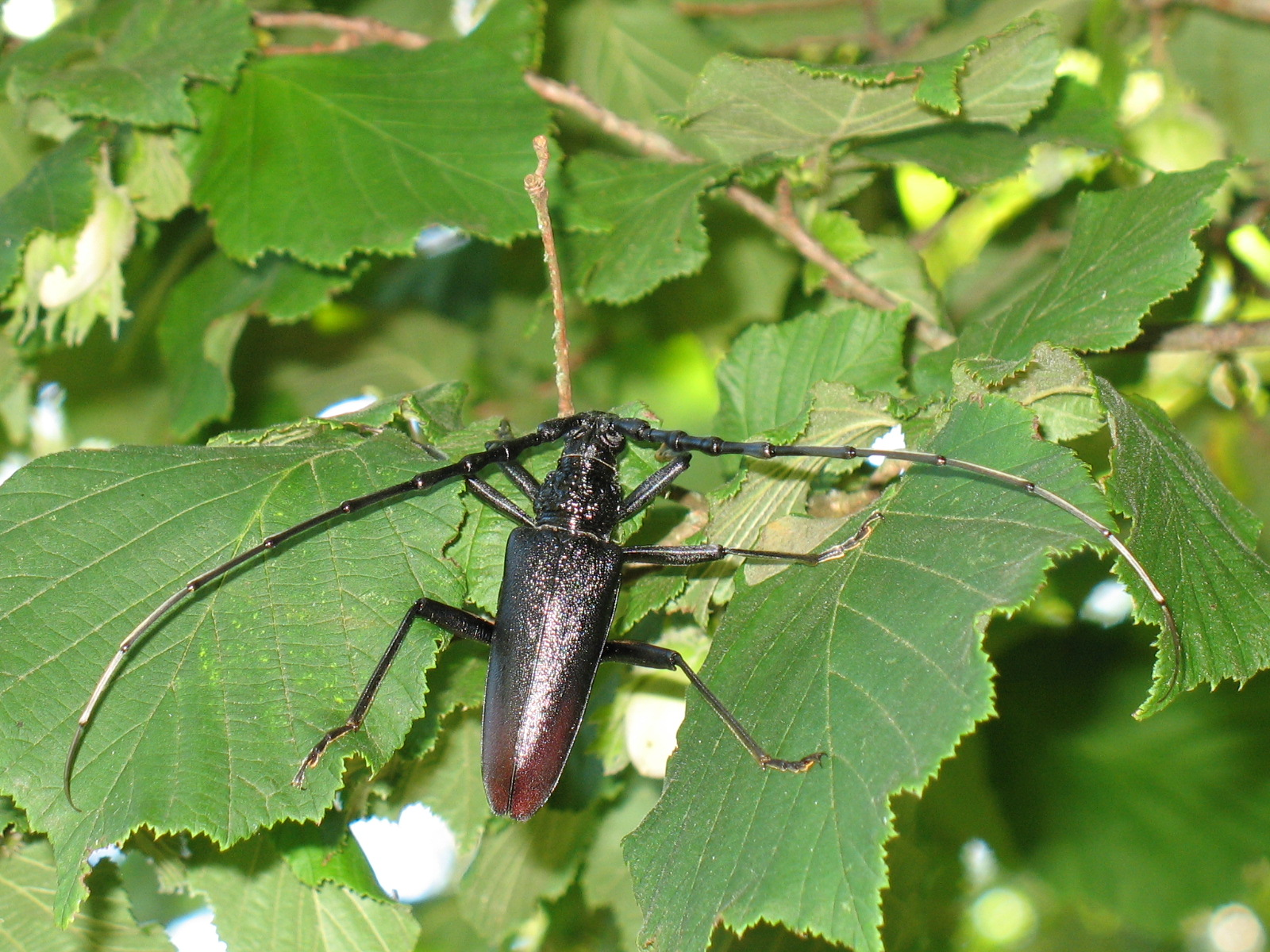
- Great capricorn beetle, Cerambyx cerdo

Scientific classification
- Domain: Eukaryota
- Kingdom: Animalia
- Phylum: Arthropoda
- Class: Insecta
- Order: Coleoptera
- Suborder: Polyphaga
- Infraorder: Cucujiformia
- Family: Cerambycidae
- Tribe: Cerambycini
- Genus: Cerambyx; Linnaeus, 1758

= Cerambyx =

Capricorn beetles

Genus of beetles

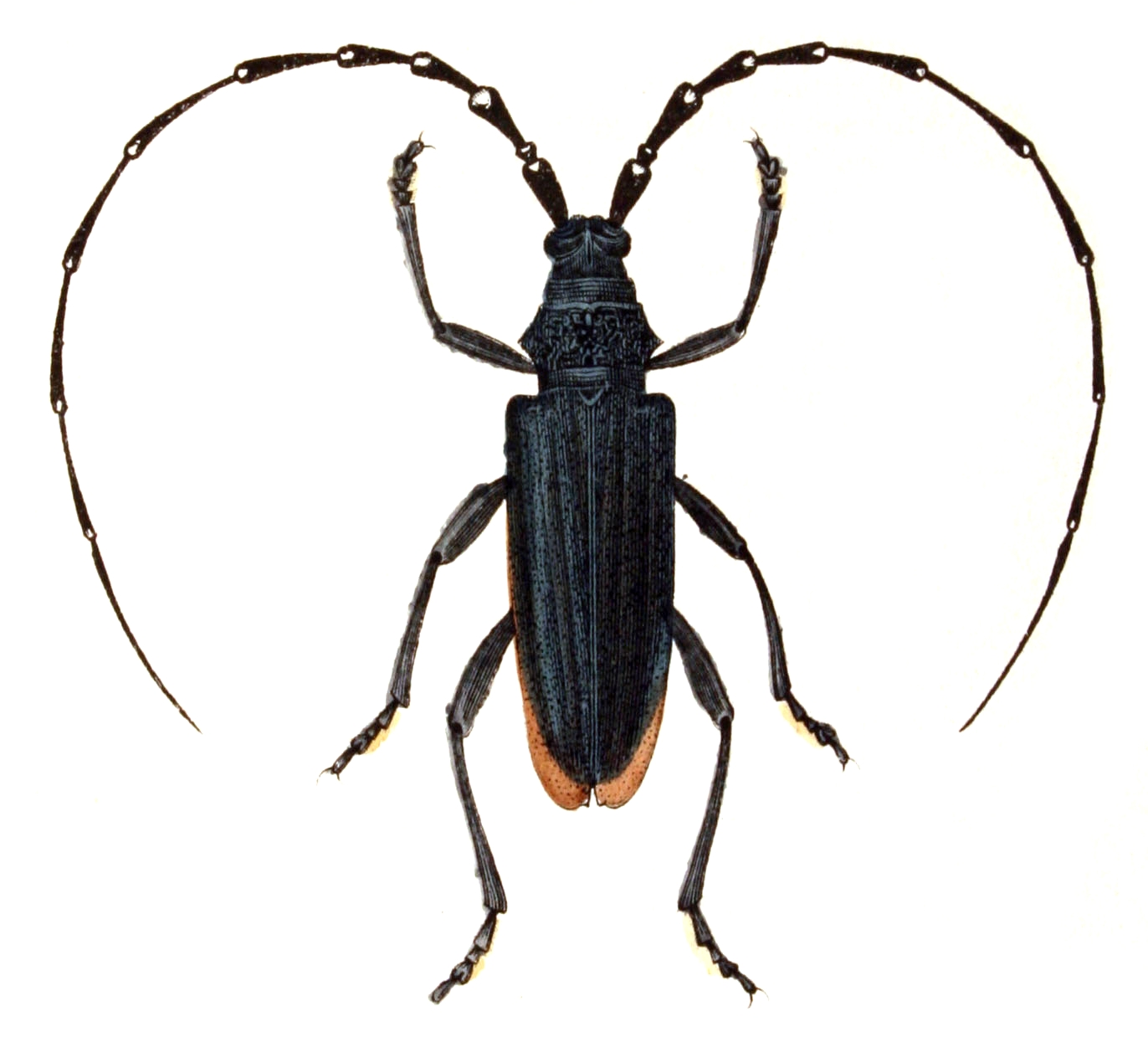
C. scopolii

Cerambyx is a genus of beetles in the family Cerambycidae (longhorn beetles). They are commonly known as capricorn beetles, as their strong, stout and curved antennae, each segment of which flares towards the tip, are reminiscent of the horns of an Alpine Ibex (Capra ibex) or "capricorn".

== Species ==
These 48 species belong to the genus Cerambyx:

- Cerambyx aestuans Olivier, 1800
- Cerambyx apiceplicatus Pic, 1941
- Cerambyx carbonarius Scopoli, 1763
- Cerambyx carinatus (Küster, 1845)
- Cerambyx castaneus Voet, 1778
- Cerambyx cerdo Linnaeus, 1758
- Cerambyx clavipes Forster, 1771
- Cerambyx coqvus Linnæus, 1758
- Cerambyx cyaneofulvus Houttuyn
- Cerambyx cyaneopunctatus Houttuyn
- Cerambyx dichropterus Dalman, 1826
- Cerambyx dux (Faldermann, 1837)
- Cerambyx elbursi Jurecek, 1924
- Cerambyx equestris Laxmann, 1770
- Cerambyx fasciatus Voet, 1778
- Cerambyx ferrugineus Goeze, 1777
- Cerambyx ferruginosus Goeze, 1777
- Cerambyx gigas Fabricius, 1787
- Cerambyx heinzianus Demelt, 1976
- Cerambyx hungaricus Houttuyn
- Cerambyx juvencus Linnaeus, 1767
- Cerambyx kodymi Sláma, 2015
- Cerambyx lativitta Newman, 1850
- Cerambyx longicollis Fabricius, 1787
- Cerambyx lucidus Olivier, 1790
- Cerambyx miles Bonelli, 1812
- Cerambyx multiplicatus Motschulsky, 1859
- Cerambyx nigroplanus Houttuyn
- Cerambyx nodulosus Germar, 1817
- Cerambyx paludivagus (Lucas, 1842)
- Cerambyx petechizans Voet, 1778
- Cerambyx praepes Voet, 1778
- Cerambyx pullus Newman, 1851
- Cerambyx pulverulentus Houttuyn
- Cerambyx quadrimaculatus Houttuyn
- Cerambyx quadripunctatus Fabricius, 1801
- Cerambyx ruberrimus Houttuyn
- Cerambyx rufus Voet, 1806
- Cerambyx scopolii Füssli, 1775
- Cerambyx serraticornis Houttuyn
- Cerambyx spinicornis Drury, 1773
- Cerambyx subserratus Newman, 1850
- Cerambyx surinamensis Voet, 1778
- Cerambyx tau Frölich, 1792
- Cerambyx tuberculosus Houttuyn
- Cerambyx umbraticus Olivier, 1795
- Cerambyx violaceus Houttuyn
- Cerambyx welensii (Küster, 1846)
