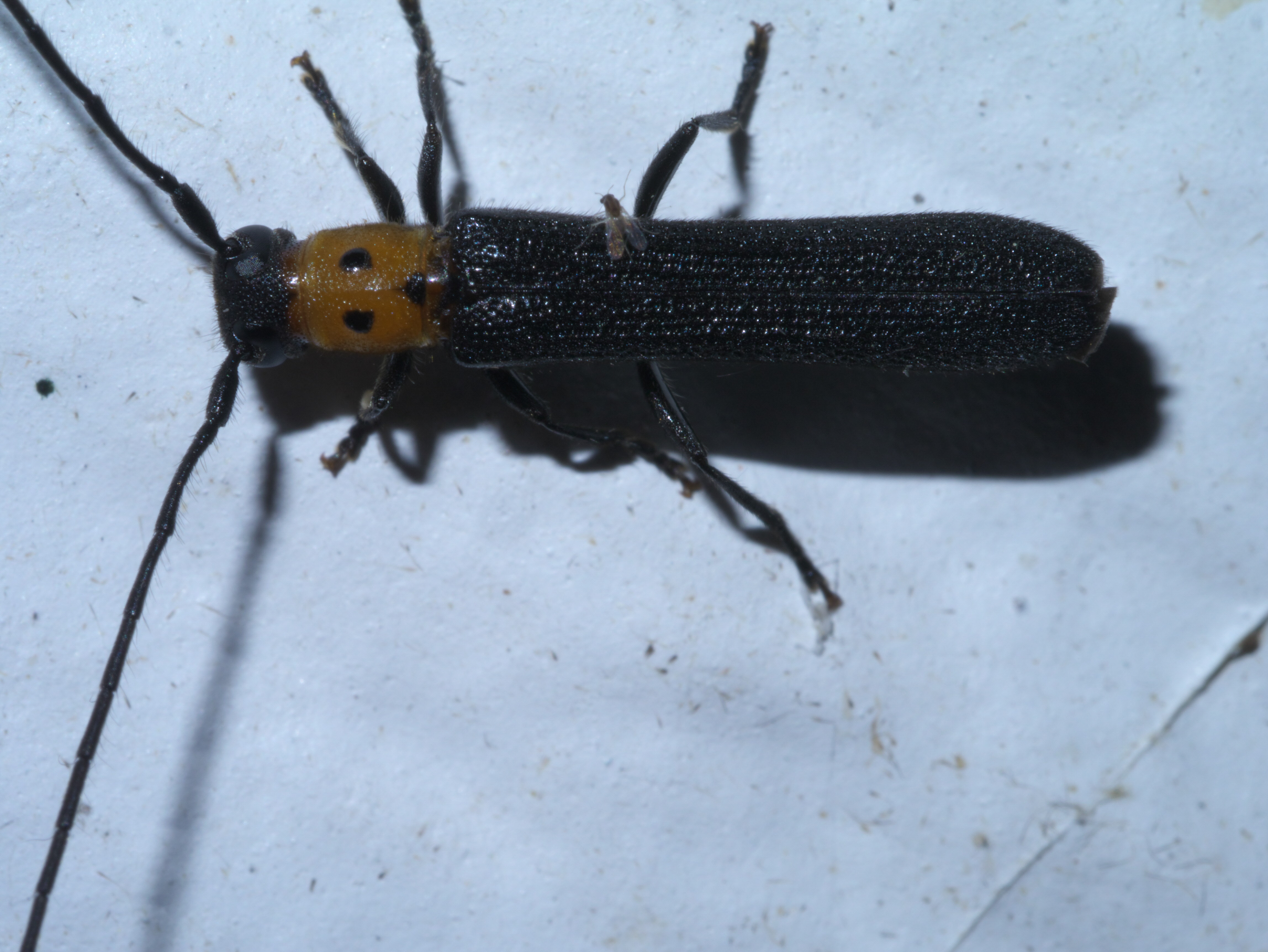

Scientific classification
- Kingdom: Animalia
- Phylum: Arthropoda
- Class: Insecta
- Order: Coleoptera
- Suborder: Polyphaga
- Infraorder: Cucujiformia
- Family: Cerambycidae
- Subfamily: Lamiinae
- Tribe: Saperdini
- Genus: Oberea; Dejean, 1835

Diversity
- At least 310 species

Synonyms
- Amaurostoma Mueller, 1906; Isosceles Newman, 1842

= Oberea =

Oberea Temporal range: Rupelian to present

Genus of beetles

Oberea is a genus of longhorn beetles, most of which are stem borers of various plants, including blackberries and their relatives.

== See also ==
- List of Oberea species
