= Ceroplesis buettneri =

Scientific classification
- Domain: Eukaryota
- Kingdom: Animalia
- Phylum: Arthropoda
- Class: Insecta
- Order: Coleoptera
- Suborder: Polyphaga
- Infraorder: Cucujiformia
- Family: Cerambycidae
- Genus: Ceroplesis
- Species: C. buettneri

Binomial name
- Ceroplesis buettneri (Kolbe, 1863)

Synonyms
- Moecha büttneri Kolbe, 1863

Species of beetle

Ceroplesis buettneri is a species of beetle in the family Cerambycidae. It was described by Kolbe in 1863. It is known from Benin, Ghana, the Ivory Coast, and Togo.
