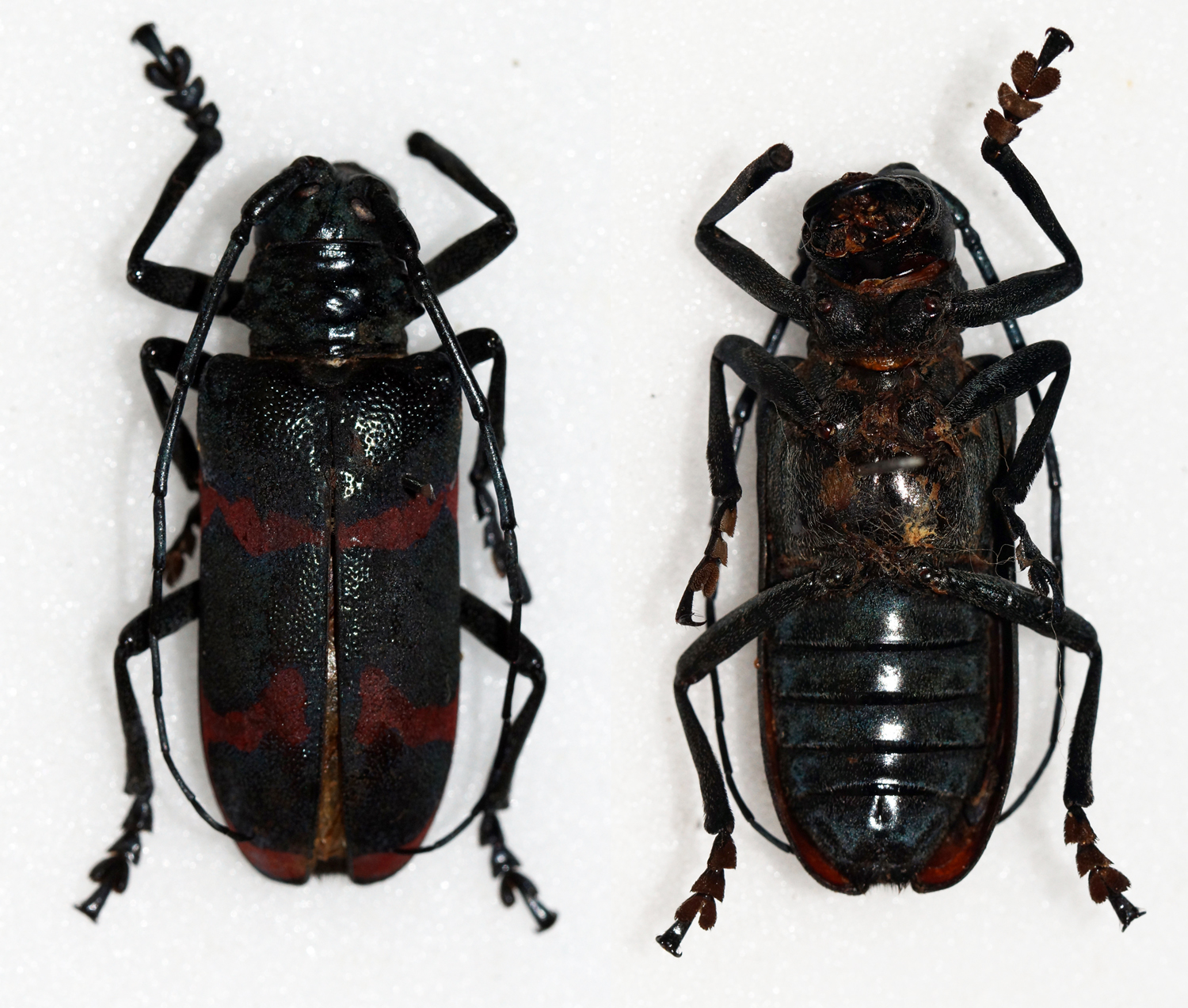

Scientific classification
- Kingdom: Animalia
- Phylum: Arthropoda
- Clade: Pancrustacea
- Class: Insecta
- Order: Coleoptera
- Suborder: Polyphaga
- Infraorder: Cucujiformia
- Family: Cerambycidae
- Genus: Ceroplesis
- Species: C. aestuans

Binomial name
- Ceroplesis aestuans (Olivier, 1795)

Synonyms
- Cerambyx aestuans Olivier, 1795

= Ceroplesis aestuans =

Species of beetle

Ceroplesis aestuans is a species of beetle in the family Cerambycidae. It was described by Guillaume-Antoine Olivier in 1795. It is known from Benin, Eritrea, Cameroon, Senegal, Morocco, Togo, and Uganda.

== Subspecies ==
- Ceroplesis aestuans aestuans (Olivier, 1795)
- Ceroplesis aestuans guineensis Hintz, 1920
