= Ceroplesis minuta =

Scientific classification
- Domain: Eukaryota
- Kingdom: Animalia
- Phylum: Arthropoda
- Class: Insecta
- Order: Coleoptera
- Suborder: Polyphaga
- Infraorder: Cucujiformia
- Family: Cerambycidae
- Genus: Ceroplesis
- Species: C. minuta

Binomial name
- Ceroplesis minuta Jordan, 1894

Species of beetle

Ceroplesis minuta is a species of beetle in the family Cerambycidae. It was described by Karl Jordan in 1894. It is known from South Africa.
