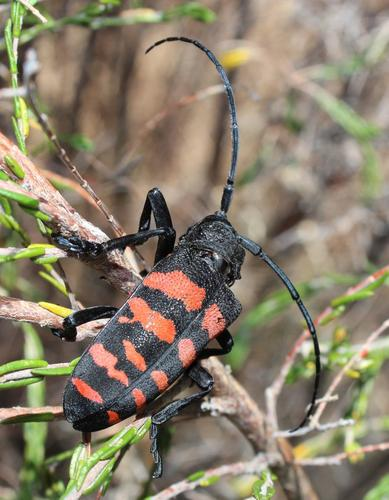

Scientific classification
- Kingdom: Animalia
- Phylum: Arthropoda
- Class: Insecta
- Order: Coleoptera
- Suborder: Polyphaga
- Infraorder: Cucujiformia
- Family: Cerambycidae
- Genus: Ceroplesis
- Species: C. capensis

Binomial name
- Ceroplesis capensis (Linnaeus, 1764)

Synonyms
- Cerambyx capensis Linnaeus, 1764; Cerambyx rubrocingulo Voet; Lamia capensis (Linnaeus) Fabricius, 1775

= Ceroplesis capensis =

Species of beetle

Ceroplesis capensis, the cape longhorn beetle, is a species of beetle in the family Cerambycidae. It was described by Carl Linnaeus in 1764. It's native to South Africa.
