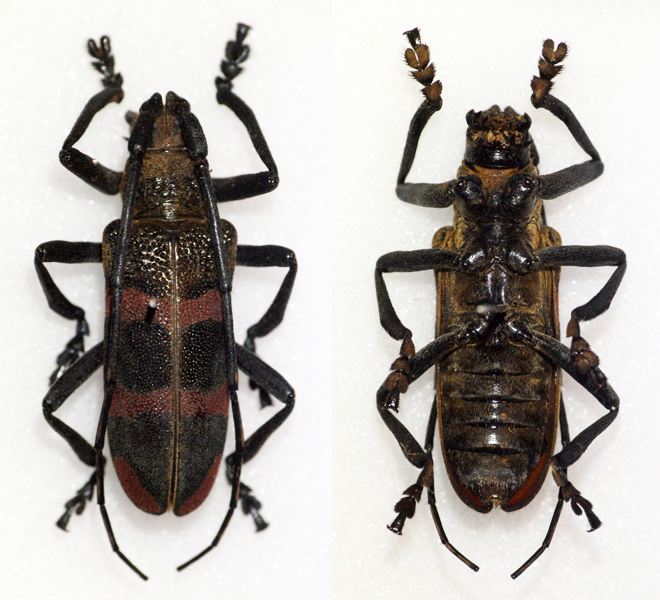

Scientific classification
- Domain: Eukaryota
- Kingdom: Animalia
- Phylum: Arthropoda
- Class: Insecta
- Order: Coleoptera
- Suborder: Polyphaga
- Infraorder: Cucujiformia
- Family: Cerambycidae
- Genus: Ceroplesis
- Species: C. conradti

Binomial name
- Ceroplesis conradti Kolbe, 1893

= Ceroplesis conradti =

Species of beetle

Ceroplesis conradti is a species of beetle in the family Cerambycidae. It was described by Kolbe in 1893. It is known from Tanzania and the Central African Republic. It contains the varietas Ceroplesis conradti var. fulvovestita. The species feeds on Acacia decurrens and Chlorophora excelsa.
