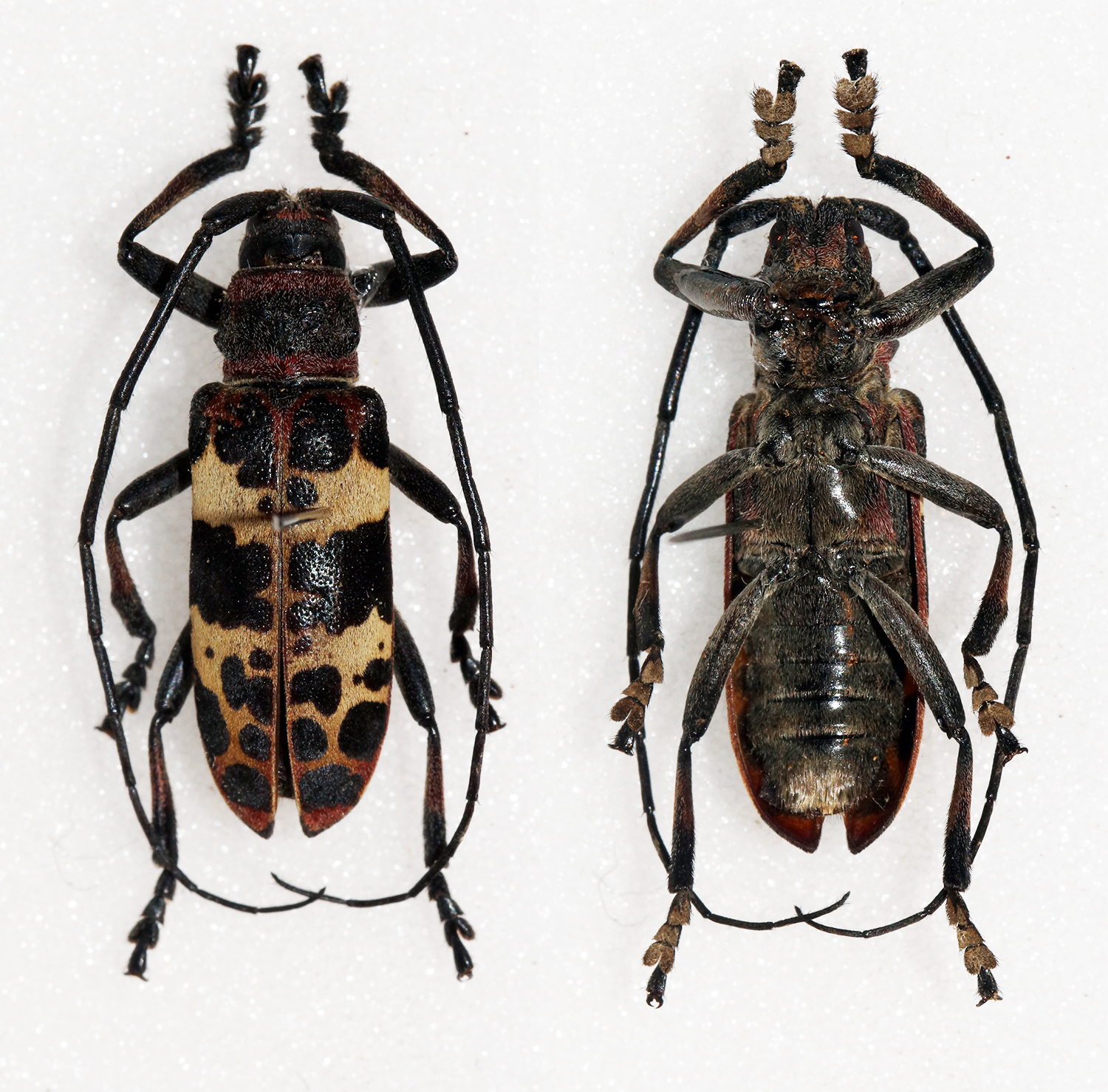

Scientific classification
- Domain: Eukaryota
- Kingdom: Animalia
- Phylum: Arthropoda
- Class: Insecta
- Order: Coleoptera
- Suborder: Polyphaga
- Infraorder: Cucujiformia
- Family: Cerambycidae
- Genus: Ceroplesis
- Species: C. rubrocincta

Binomial name
- Ceroplesis rubrocincta (Hintz, 1911)

Synonyms
- Moecha rubrocincta Hintz, 1911

= Ceroplesis rubrocincta =

Species of beetle

Ceroplesis rubrocincta is a species of beetle in the family Cerambycidae. It was described by Hintz in 1911. It is known from Kenya, the Democratic Republic of the Congo, and Tanzania.
