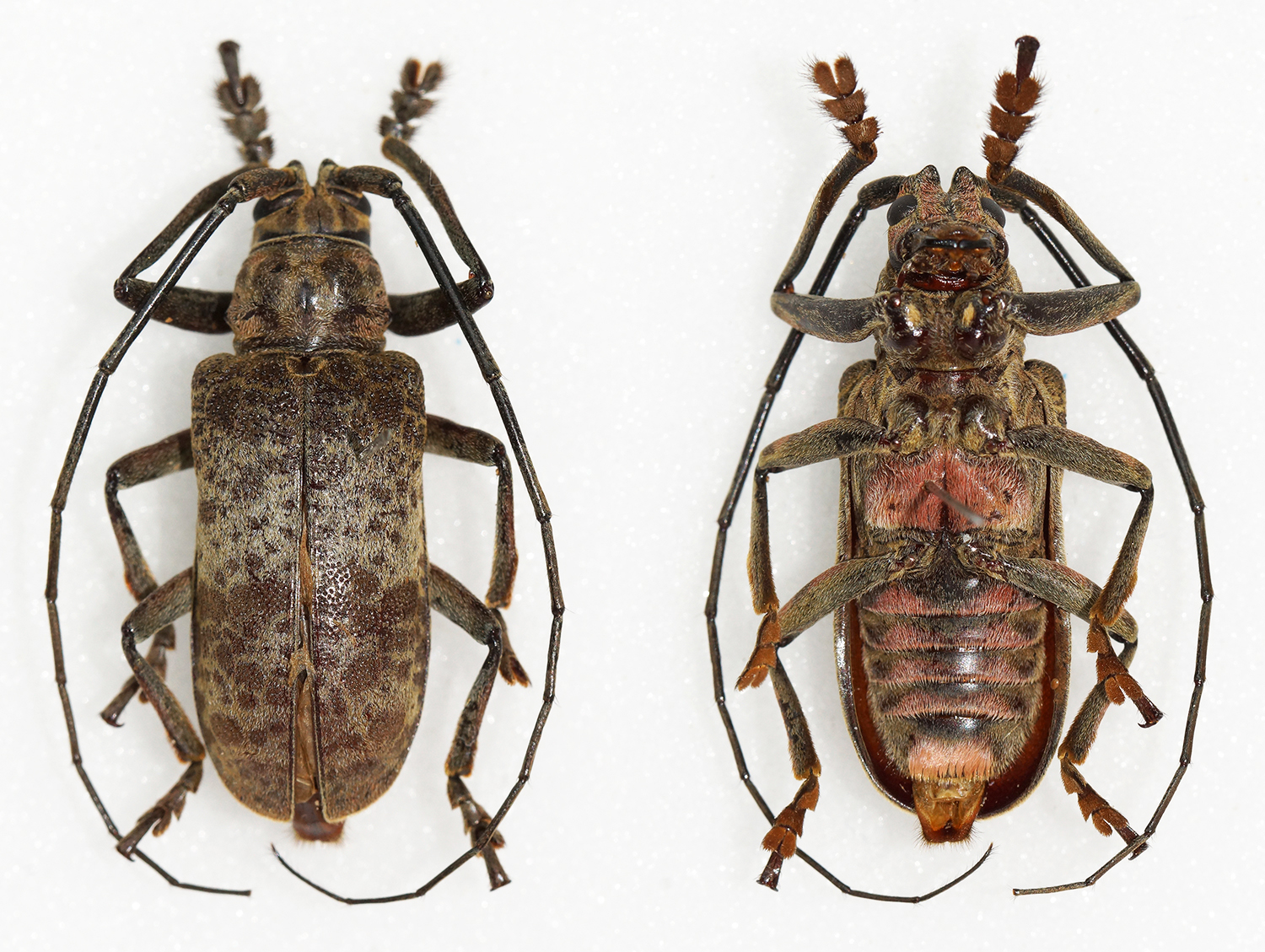

Scientific classification
- Domain: Eukaryota
- Kingdom: Animalia
- Phylum: Arthropoda
- Class: Insecta
- Order: Coleoptera
- Suborder: Polyphaga
- Infraorder: Cucujiformia
- Family: Cerambycidae
- Genus: Ceroplesis
- Species: C. adusta

Binomial name
- Ceroplesis adusta (Harold, 1879)

Synonyms
- Moecha adusta Harold, 1879

= Ceroplesis adusta =

Species of beetle

Ceroplesis adusta is a species of beetle in the family Cerambycidae. It was described by Harold in 1879. It has a broad distribution, and is known from Angola, Benin, Chad, Cameroon, the Democratic Republic of the Congo, the Republic of the Congo, the Central African Republic, Equatorial Guinea, Ghana, Togo, Gabon, Nigeria, Uganda, and the Ivory Coast. It feeds off of plants such as Theobroma cacao, Coffea arabica, Coffea canephora, Albizia adianthifolia, and Celtis zenkeri.
