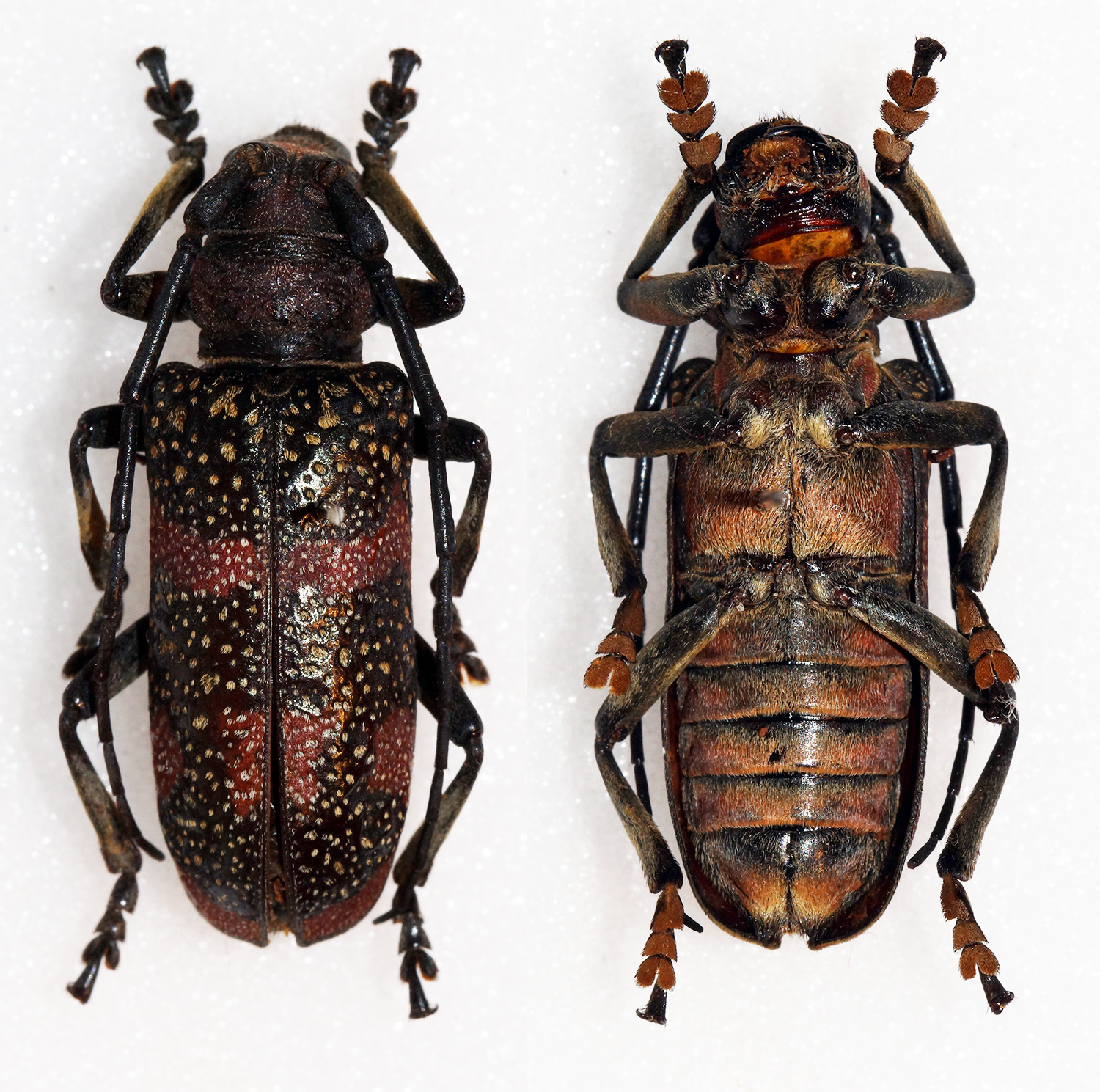

Scientific classification
- Kingdom: Animalia
- Phylum: Arthropoda
- Class: Insecta
- Order: Coleoptera
- Suborder: Polyphaga
- Infraorder: Cucujiformia
- Family: Cerambycidae
- Genus: Ceroplesis
- Species: C. revoili

Binomial name
- Ceroplesis revoili Fairmaire, 1882

= Ceroplesis revoili =

Species of beetle

Ceroplesis revoili is a species of longhorn beetle in the family Cerambycidae, subfamily Lamiinae. It was first described by the French entomologist Léon Fairmaire in 1882. The species is native to eastern Africa and the Horn of Africa.

== Taxonomy ==
Ceroplesis revoili belongs to the tribe Ceroplesini within the subfamily Lamiinae. Several names historically applied to this taxon are now considered synonyms, including Ceroplesis pauli Fairmaire, 1884 and Ceroplesis lacunosa Gerstäcker, 1884, which are treated as junior synonyms or subspecific taxa in modern catalogues.

Two subspecies are currently recognized based on morphological characters and geographic distribution: the nominotypical Ceroplesis revoili revoili Fairmaire, 1882, and Ceroplesis revoili pauli Fairmaire, 1884.

== Description ==
Adults of Ceroplesis revoili are relatively large longhorn beetles with an elongated, robust body and long antennae, typical of the genus Ceroplesis. Reported body length ranges from approximately 27 to 39 mm, with males generally larger than females. Coloration usually consists of contrasting dark and lighter areas on the elytra and pronotum, though the intensity and pattern vary between individuals and subspecies.

== Distribution and habitat ==
The species is known from Ethiopia, Kenya, Tanzania, and Somalia. The nominotypical subspecies occurs primarily in Ethiopia and Somalia, while C. revoili pauli is recorded from Kenya, Tanzania, and Somalia.

Ceroplesis revoili inhabits savanna and woodland habitats. Larvae of the subspecies Ceroplesis revoili pauli have been recorded developing in dead wood of Acacia species, indicating an association with woody plants typical of dry and semi-arid environments.
