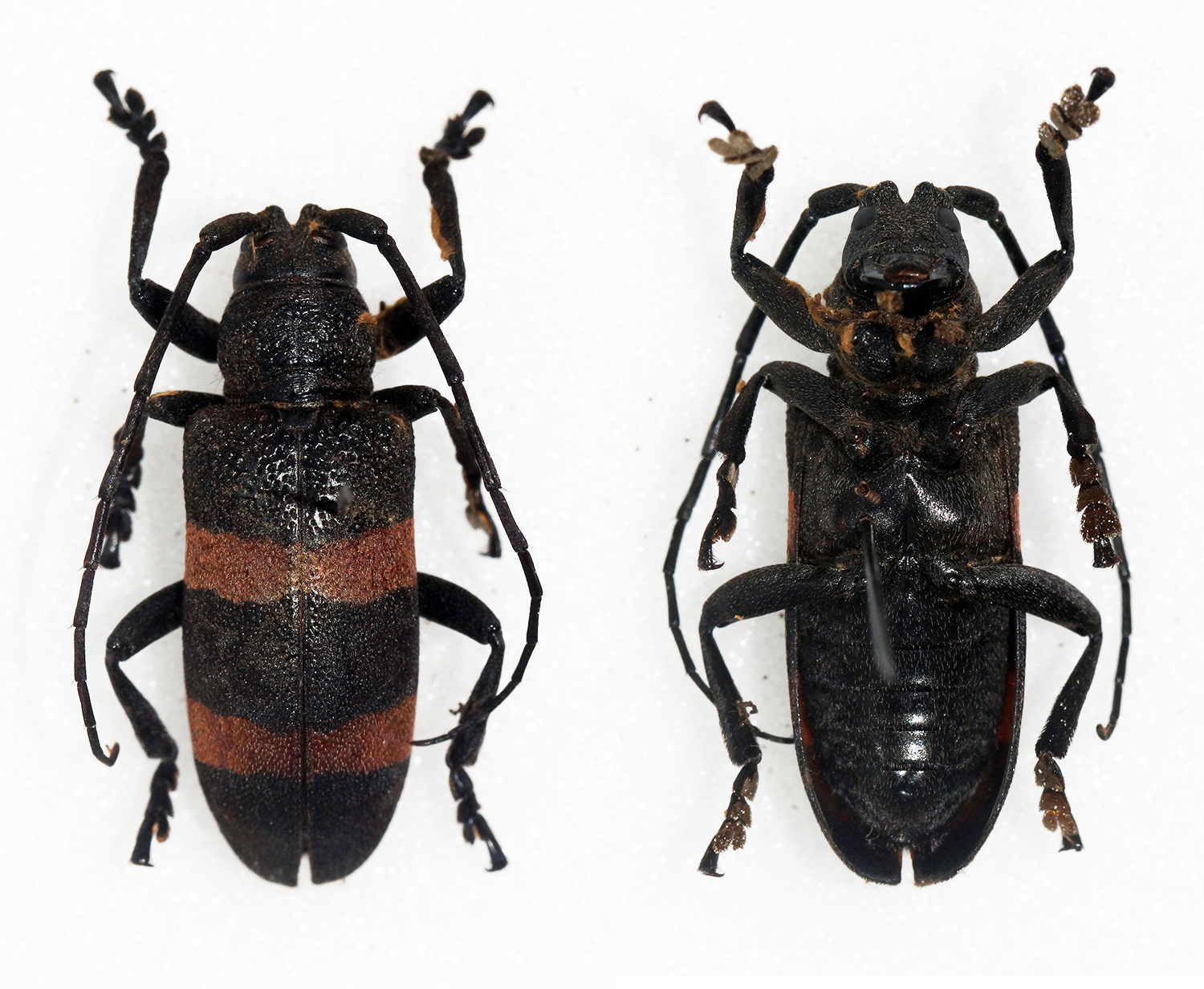

Scientific classification
- Kingdom: Animalia
- Phylum: Arthropoda
- Clade: Pancrustacea
- Class: Insecta
- Order: Coleoptera
- Suborder: Polyphaga
- Infraorder: Cucujiformia
- Family: Cerambycidae
- Genus: Ceroplesis
- Species: C. bicincta

Binomial name
- Ceroplesis bicincta (Fabricius, 1798)

Synonyms
- Cerambyx continuus Olivier, 1795; Lamia bicincta Fabricius, 1798

= Ceroplesis bicincta =

Species of beetle

Ceroplesis bicincta is a species of beetle in the family Cerambycidae. It was described by Johan Christian Fabricius in 1798. It is known from the Democratic Republic of the Congo, Angola, Namibia, Tanzania, and South Africa. The species contains the variety Ceroplesis bicincta var. centralis. It feeds off of Theobroma cacao.
