= Ceroplesis semitrabeata =

Scientific classification
- Kingdom: Animalia
- Phylum: Arthropoda
- Class: Insecta
- Order: Coleoptera
- Suborder: Polyphaga
- Infraorder: Cucujiformia
- Family: Cerambycidae
- Genus: Ceroplesis
- Species: C. semitrabeata

Binomial name
- Ceroplesis semitrabeata Fairmaire, 1887

Species of beetle

Ceroplesis semitrabeata is a species of beetle in the family Cerambycidae. It was described by Fairmaire in 1887. It is known from Malawi and Tanzania.

== Varietas ==
- Ceroplesis semitrabeata var. puguana Fiedler, 1938
- Ceroplesis semitrabeata var. tomentosa Fiedler, 1938
