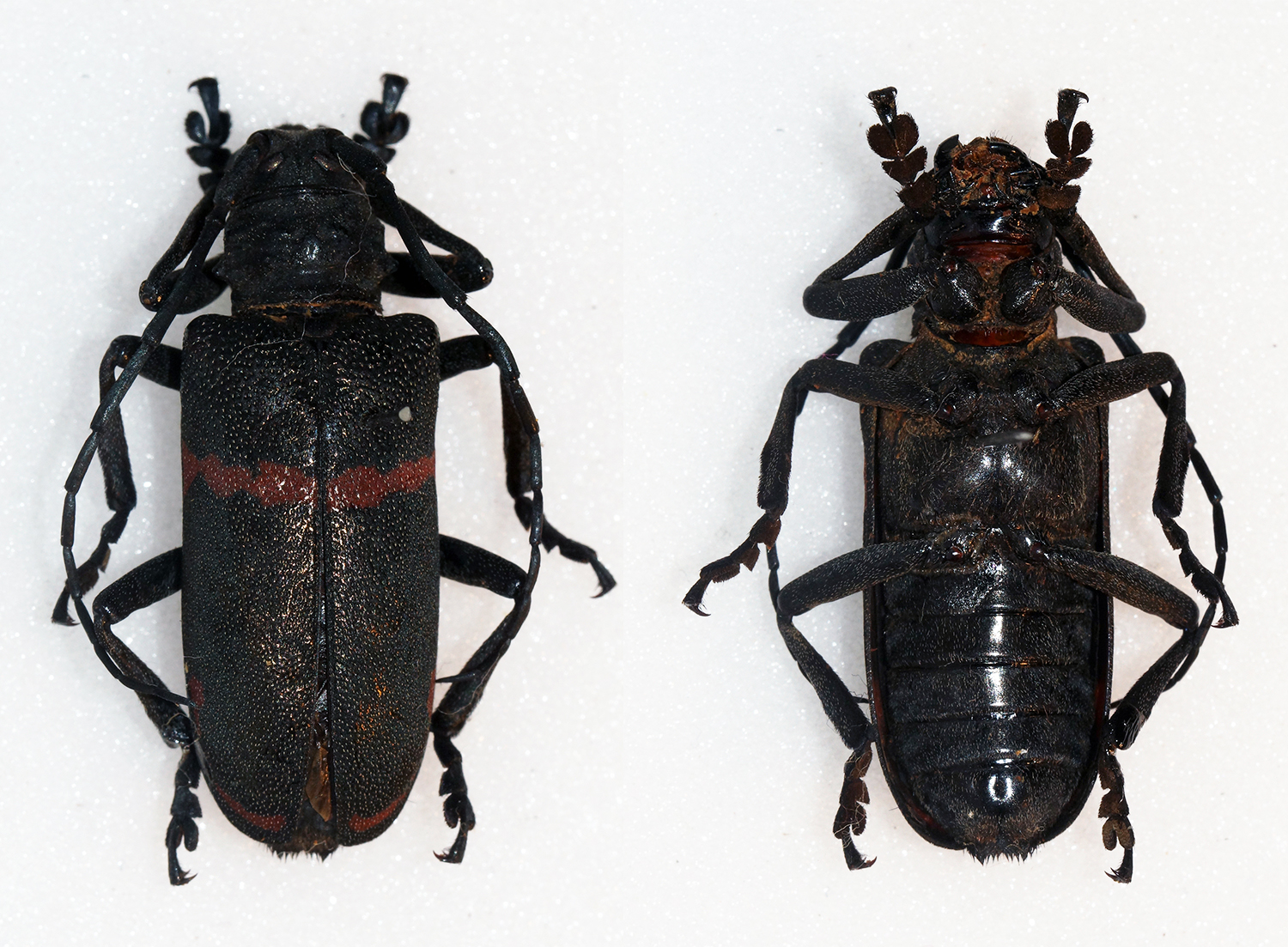

Scientific classification
- Kingdom: Animalia
- Phylum: Arthropoda
- Class: Insecta
- Order: Coleoptera
- Suborder: Polyphaga
- Infraorder: Cucujiformia
- Family: Cerambycidae
- Genus: Ceroplesis
- Species: C. aenescens

Binomial name
- Ceroplesis aenescens Fairmaire, 1893

= Ceroplesis aenescens =

Species of beetle

Ceroplesis aenescens is a species of beetle in the family Cerambycidae. It was described by Fairmaire in 1893. It is known from Ethiopia.
