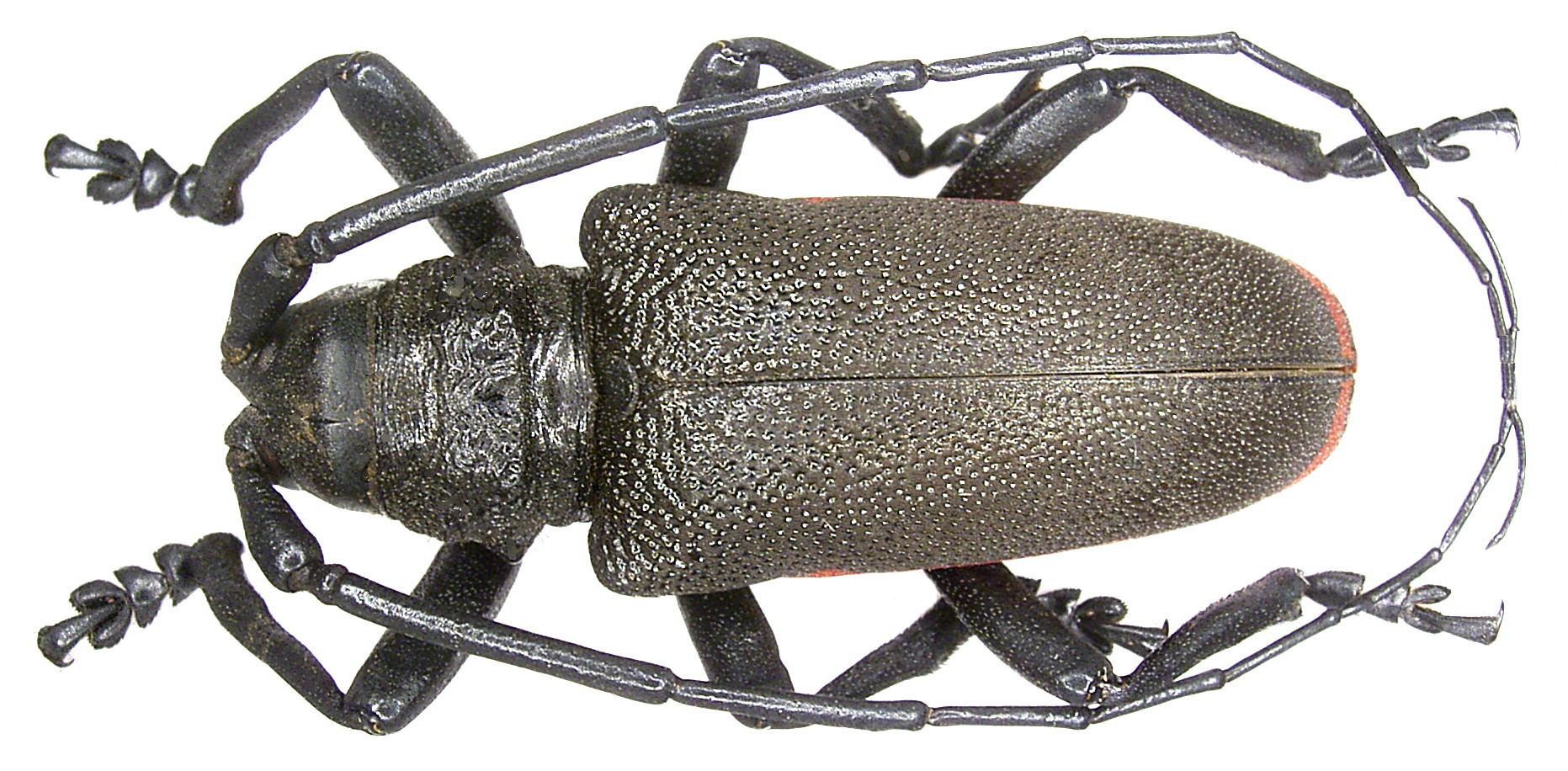

Scientific classification
- Kingdom: Animalia
- Phylum: Arthropoda
- Clade: Pancrustacea
- Class: Insecta
- Order: Coleoptera
- Suborder: Polyphaga
- Infraorder: Cucujiformia
- Family: Cerambycidae
- Genus: Ceroplesis
- Species: C. ferrugator

Binomial name
- Ceroplesis ferrugator (Fabricius, 1787)

Synonyms
- Lamia ferrugator Fabricius, 1787; Lamia ahenea Newman, 1840; Ceroplesis ferrugator var. marginalis Fahraeus, 1872; Ceroplesis ferrugator m. subholonigra Breuning, 1981

= Ceroplesis ferrugator =

Species of beetle

Ceroplesis ferrugator is a species of beetle in the family Cerambycidae. It was described by Johan Christian Fabricius in 1787. It is known from Mozambique, Botswana, South Africa, Namibia, and Zimbabwe.
