= Ceroplesis marmorata =

Scientific classification
- Kingdom: Animalia
- Phylum: Arthropoda
- Class: Insecta
- Order: Coleoptera
- Suborder: Polyphaga
- Infraorder: Cucujiformia
- Family: Cerambycidae
- Genus: Ceroplesis
- Species: C. marmorata

Binomial name
- Ceroplesis marmorata Reiche, 1849

Species of beetle

Ceroplesis marmorata is a species of beetle in the family Cerambycidae. It was described by Reiche in 1849. It is known from Ethiopia and Erythrea.
