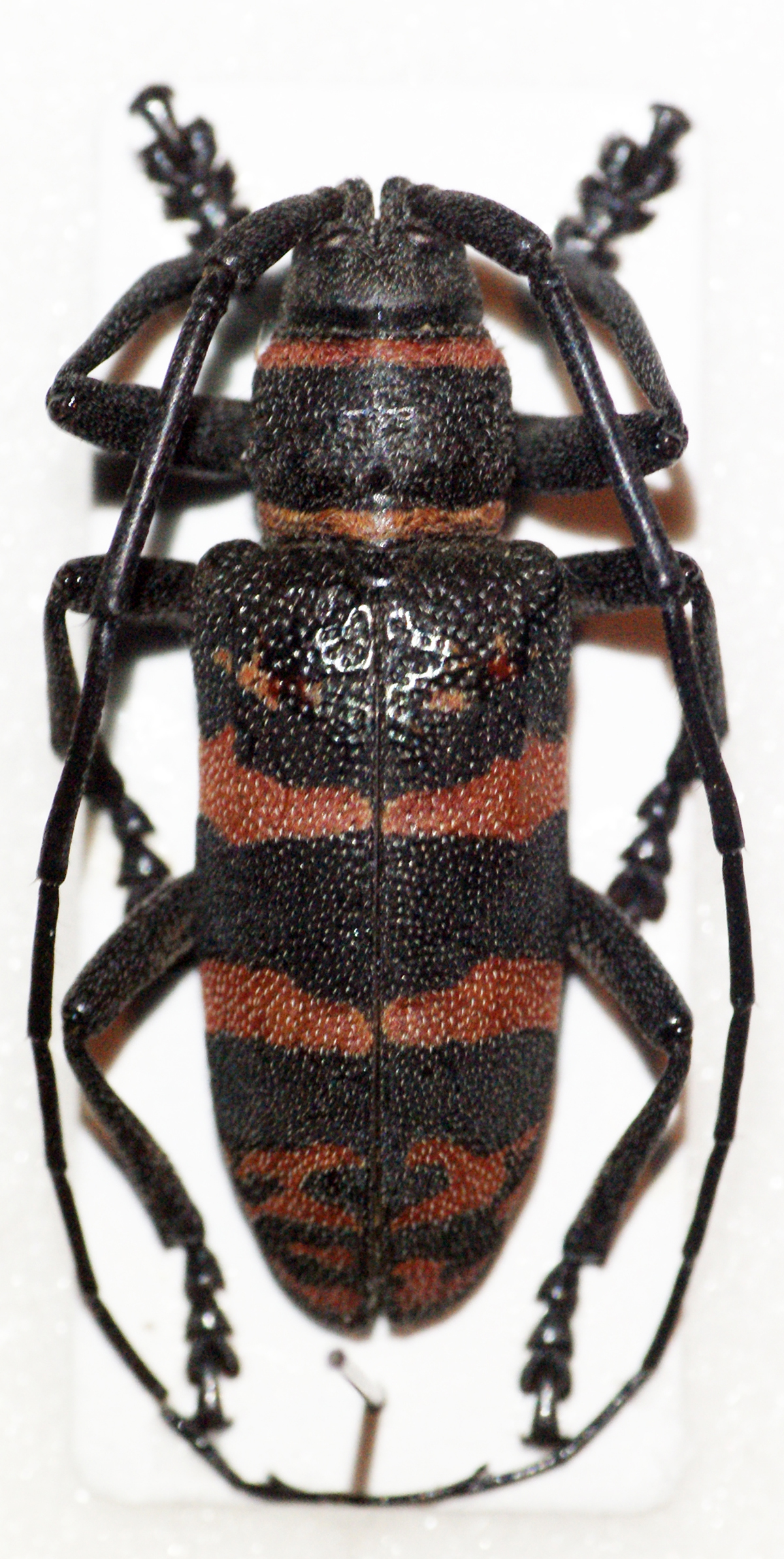
- Ceroplesis poggei malepicta

Scientific classification
- Domain: Eukaryota
- Kingdom: Animalia
- Phylum: Arthropoda
- Class: Insecta
- Order: Coleoptera
- Suborder: Polyphaga
- Infraorder: Cucujiformia
- Family: Cerambycidae
- Genus: Ceroplesis
- Species: C. poggei

Binomial name
- Ceroplesis poggei Harold, 1878

= Ceroplesis poggei =

Species of beetle

Ceroplesis poggei is a species of beetle in the family Cerambycidae. It was described by Harold in 1878.

== Distribution ==
It is known from Angola, the Democratic Republic of the Congo, the Republic of the Congo, Mozambique, Uganda, Tanzania, Zimbabwe, and Zambia.

== Subspecies ==
- Ceroplesis poggei malepicta Fairmaire, 1882
- Ceroplesis poggei poggei Harold, 1878
