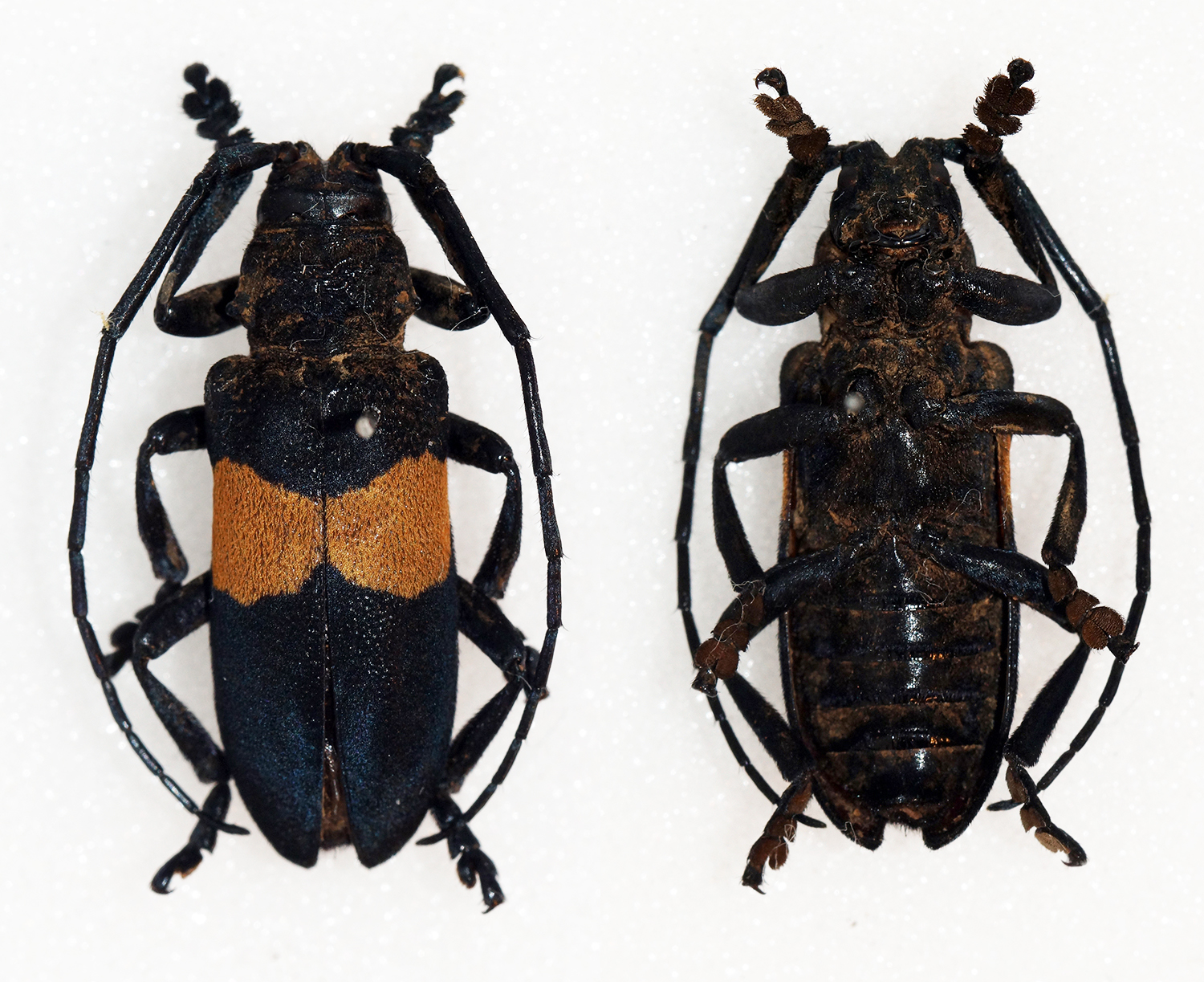

Scientific classification
- Domain: Eukaryota
- Kingdom: Animalia
- Phylum: Arthropoda
- Class: Insecta
- Order: Coleoptera
- Suborder: Polyphaga
- Infraorder: Cucujiformia
- Family: Cerambycidae
- Genus: Ceroplesis
- Species: C. signata

Binomial name
- Ceroplesis signata Waterhouse, 1890

= Ceroplesis signata =

Species of beetle

Ceroplesis signata is a species of beetle in the family Cerambycidae. It was described by Waterhouse in 1890. It is known from Eritrea, the Democratic Republic of the Congo, Ethiopia, Uganda, Rwanda, Kenya, and Tanzania. It contains the varietas Ceroplesis signata var. maculata.
