= Ceroplesis harrisoni =

Scientific classification
- Domain: Eukaryota
- Kingdom: Animalia
- Phylum: Arthropoda
- Class: Insecta
- Order: Coleoptera
- Suborder: Polyphaga
- Infraorder: Cucujiformia
- Family: Cerambycidae
- Genus: Ceroplesis
- Species: C. harrisoni

Binomial name
- Ceroplesis harrisoni Jordan, 1895

Species of beetle

Ceroplesis harrisoni is a species of beetle in the family Cerambycidae. It was described by Karl Jordan in 1895. It is known from the Central African Republic, Cameroon, and the Democratic Republic of the Congo.
