= Ceroplesis thunbergii =

Scientific classification
- Domain: Eukaryota
- Kingdom: Animalia
- Phylum: Arthropoda
- Class: Insecta
- Order: Coleoptera
- Suborder: Polyphaga
- Infraorder: Cucujiformia
- Family: Cerambycidae
- Genus: Ceroplesis
- Species: C. thunbergii

Binomial name
- Ceroplesis thunbergii Fahraeus, 1872

Species of beetle

Ceroplesis thunbergii is a species of beetle in the family Cerambycidae. It was described by Fahraeus in 1872. It is known from Kenya and Tanzania.
