= Ceroplesis granulata =

Scientific classification
- Kingdom: Animalia
- Phylum: Arthropoda
- Class: Insecta
- Order: Coleoptera
- Suborder: Polyphaga
- Infraorder: Cucujiformia
- Family: Cerambycidae
- Genus: Ceroplesis
- Species: C. granulata

Binomial name
- Ceroplesis granulata Breuning, 1937

Species of beetle

Ceroplesis granulata is a species of beetle in the family Cerambycidae. It was described by Breuning in 1937. It is known from Uganda.
