= Ceroplesis elegans =

Scientific classification
- Domain: Eukaryota
- Kingdom: Animalia
- Phylum: Arthropoda
- Class: Insecta
- Order: Coleoptera
- Suborder: Polyphaga
- Infraorder: Cucujiformia
- Family: Cerambycidae
- Genus: Ceroplesis
- Species: C. elegans

Binomial name
- Ceroplesis elegans Gestro, 1889

Species of beetle

Ceroplesis elegans is a species of beetle in the family Cerambycidae. It was described by Gestro in 1889. It is known from Saudi Arabia and Yemen.
