= Ceroplesis scorteccii =

Scientific classification
- Kingdom: Animalia
- Phylum: Arthropoda
- Class: Insecta
- Order: Coleoptera
- Suborder: Polyphaga
- Infraorder: Cucujiformia
- Family: Cerambycidae
- Genus: Ceroplesis
- Species: C. scorteccii

Binomial name
- Ceroplesis scorteccii Breuning, 1940

Species of beetle

Ceroplesis scorteccii is a species of beetle in the family Cerambycidae. It was described by Breuning in 1940. It is known from Ethiopia.
