= Ceroplesis analeptoides =

Scientific classification
- Kingdom: Animalia
- Phylum: Arthropoda
- Class: Insecta
- Order: Coleoptera
- Suborder: Polyphaga
- Infraorder: Cucujiformia
- Family: Cerambycidae
- Genus: Ceroplesis
- Species: C. analeptoides

Binomial name
- Ceroplesis analeptoides Lepesme, 1950

Species of beetle

Ceroplesis analeptoides is a species of beetle in the family Cerambycidae. It was described by Lepesme in 1950. it is known from Sierra Leone and the Ivory Coast.
