= Ceroplesis fasciata =

Scientific classification
- Kingdom: Animalia
- Phylum: Arthropoda
- Class: Insecta
- Order: Coleoptera
- Suborder: Polyphaga
- Infraorder: Cucujiformia
- Family: Cerambycidae
- Genus: Ceroplesis
- Species: C. fasciata

Binomial name
- Ceroplesis fasciata Aurivillius, 1913

Species of beetle

Ceroplesis fasciata is a species of beetle in the family Cerambycidae. It was described by Per Olof Christopher Aurivillius in 1913 and is known from the Democratic Republic of the Congo.
