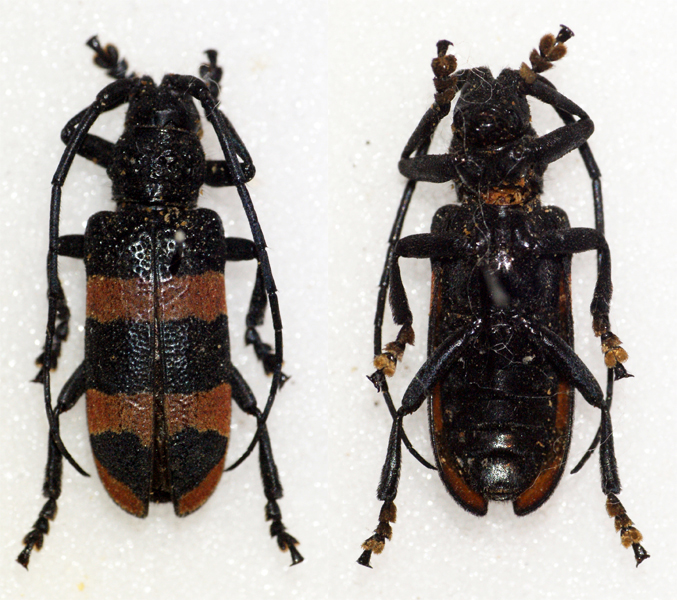

Scientific classification
- Kingdom: Animalia
- Phylum: Arthropoda
- Class: Insecta
- Order: Coleoptera
- Suborder: Polyphaga
- Infraorder: Cucujiformia
- Family: Cerambycidae
- Genus: Ceroplesis
- Species: C. orientalis

Binomial name
- Ceroplesis orientalis (Herbst, 1786)

Synonyms
- Cerambyx caffer Thunberg, 1787; Cerambyx herbsti Gmelin, 1790; Cerambyx orientalis Herbst, 1786; Ceroplesis caffer (Thunberg) Marsh., 1902; Ceroplesis orientalis ambonica Fiedler, 1938; Ceroplesis orientalis orientalis (Herbst) Breuning, 1937; Ceroplesis orientalis pseudocaffer Fiedler, 1938; Lamia lemniscata Licht., 1796; Ceroplesis bicincta (Fabricius) Ormer, 1889

= Ceroplesis orientalis =

Species of beetle

Ceroplesis orientalis is a species of beetle in the family Cerambycidae. It was described by Johann Friedrich Wilhelm Herbst in 1786. It is known from the Democratic Republic of the Congo, Angola, Cameroon, Malawi, Kenya, Gabon, Mozambique, Sierra Leone, Namibia, Somalia, Tanzania, South Africa, Zimbabwe, and Togo. It feeds on Acacia decurrens and Acacia abyssinica.

== Varieties ==
- Ceroplesis orientalis var. latevittata Fairmaire, 1891
- Ceroplesis orientalis var. leonensis Hintz, 1919
