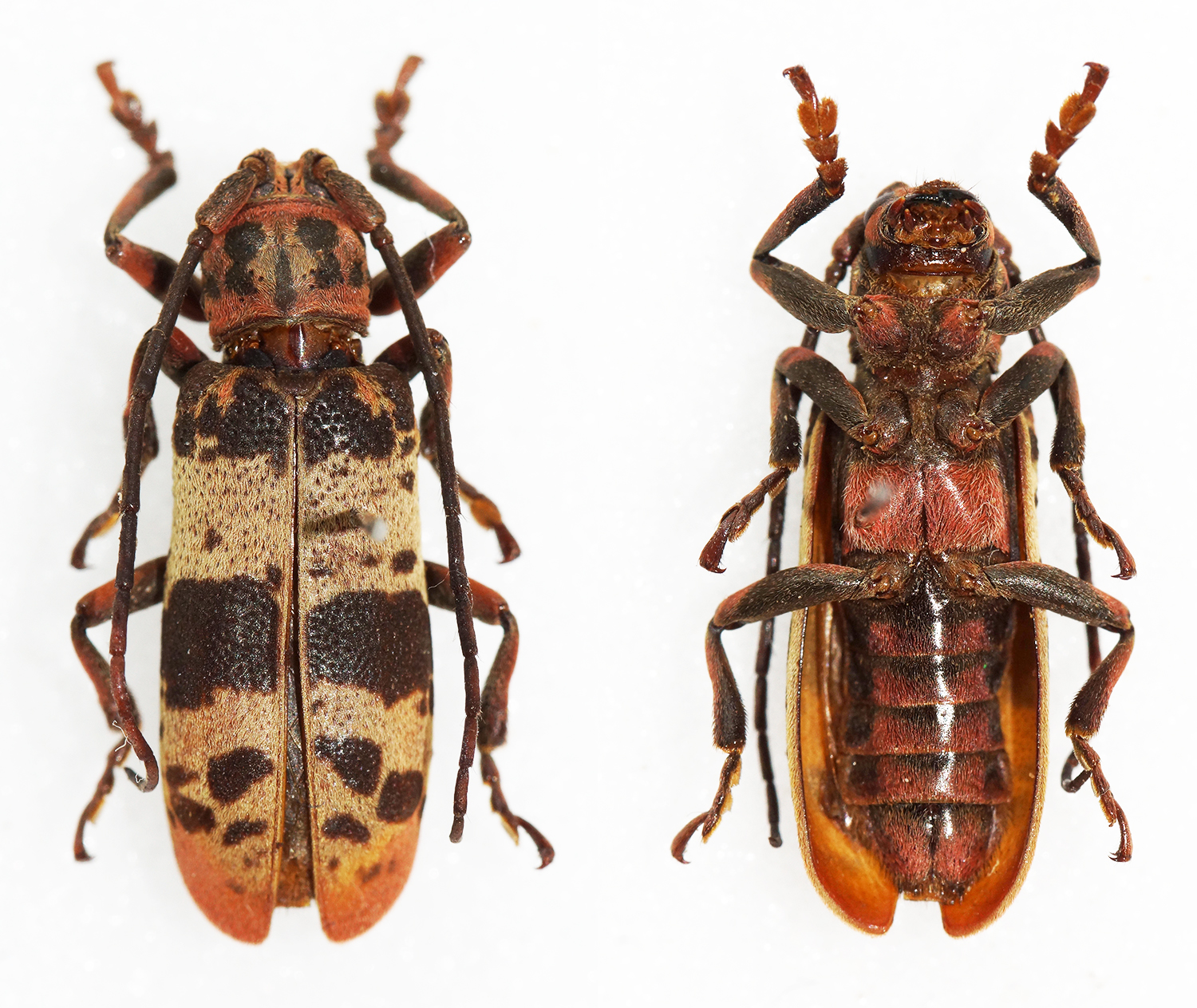

Scientific classification
- Domain: Eukaryota
- Kingdom: Animalia
- Phylum: Arthropoda
- Class: Insecta
- Order: Coleoptera
- Suborder: Polyphaga
- Infraorder: Cucujiformia
- Family: Cerambycidae
- Genus: Ceroplesis
- Species: C. hecate

Binomial name
- Ceroplesis hecate Chevrolat, 1855

= Ceroplesis hecate =

Species of beetle

Ceroplesis hecate is a species of beetle in the family Cerambycidae. It was described by Chevrolat in 1855. It is known from Angola, Benin, the Democratic Republic of the Congo, Cameroon, Ghana, Gabon, Nigeria, the Ivory Coast, and Uganda.
