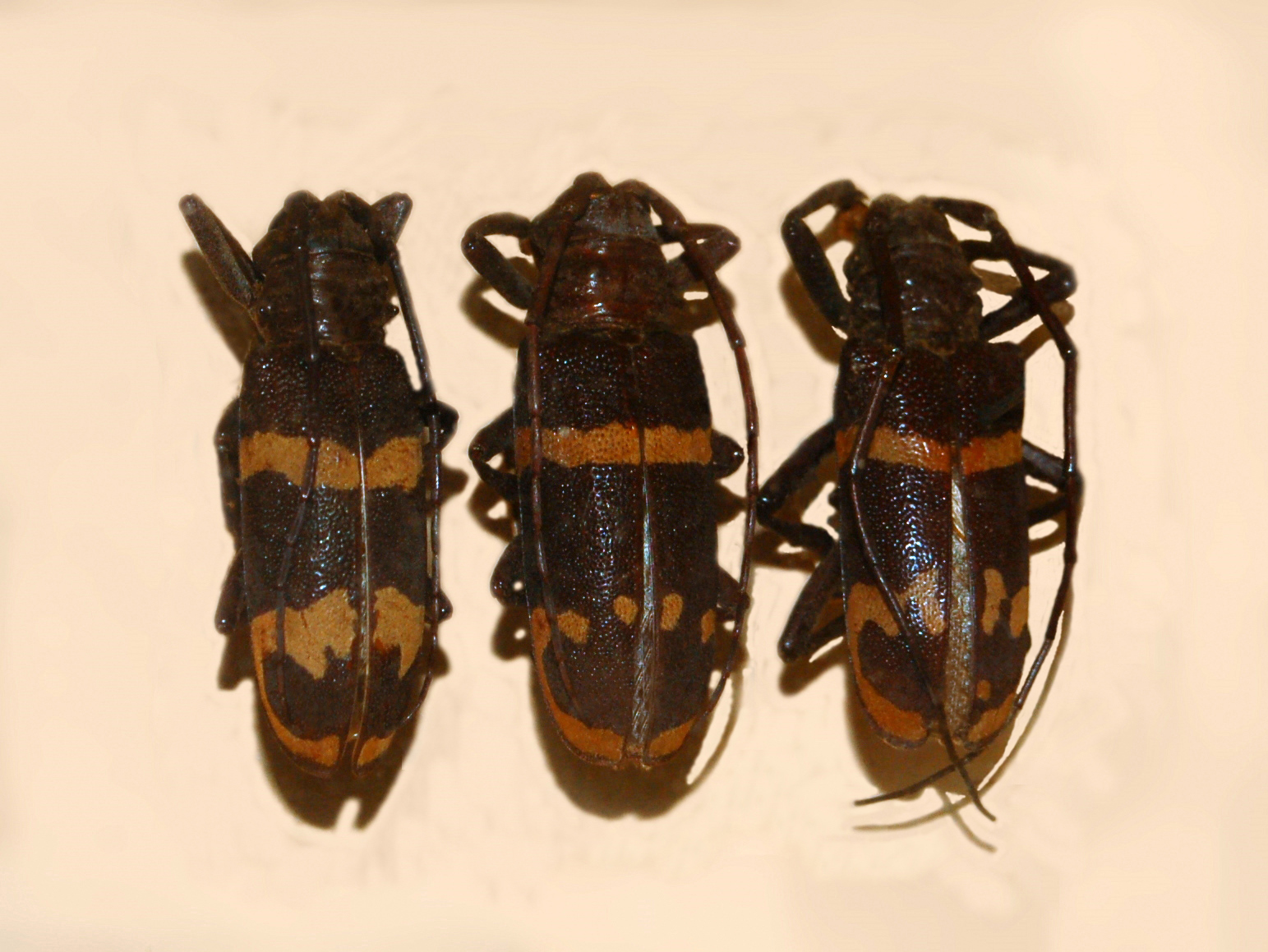
- Ceroplesis militaris from Eritrea

Scientific classification
- Domain: Eukaryota
- Kingdom: Animalia
- Phylum: Arthropoda
- Class: Insecta
- Order: Coleoptera
- Suborder: Polyphaga
- Infraorder: Cucujiformia
- Family: Cerambycidae
- Subfamily: Lamiinae
- Tribe: Ceroplesini
- Genus: Ceroplesis; Audinet-Serville, 1835

= Ceroplesis =

Genus of beetles

Ceroplesis is a genus of flat-faced longhorn beetle in the subfamily Lamiinae of the family Cerambycidae.

== Species ==
- Ceroplesis adusta (Harold, 1879)
- Ceroplesis aenescens Fairmaire, 1893
- Ceroplesis aestuans (Olivier, 1795)
- Ceroplesis aethiopica Breuning, 1974
- Ceroplesis aethiops (Fabricius, 1775)
- Ceroplesis analeptoides Lepesme, 1950
- Ceroplesis arcuata Harold, 1879
- Ceroplesis aulica Pascoe, 1875
- Ceroplesis bicincta (Fabricius, 1798)
- Ceroplesis blairi Breuning, 1937
- Ceroplesis buettneri (Kolbe, 1863)
- Ceroplesis burgeoni Breuning, 1935
- Ceroplesis calabarica Chevrolat, 1858
- Ceroplesis capensis (Linnaeus, 1764)
- Ceroplesis conradti Kolbe, 1893
- Ceroplesis elegans Gestro, 1889
- Ceroplesis elgonensis Aurivillius, 1923
- Ceroplesis fasciata Aurivillius, 1913
- Ceroplesis ferrugator (Fabricius, 1787)
- Ceroplesis granulata Breuning, 1937
- Ceroplesis griseotincta Fairmaire, 1891
- Ceroplesis hamiltoni Aurivillius, 1915
- Ceroplesis harrisoni Jordan, 1895
- Ceroplesis hauseri Hintz, 1910
- Ceroplesis hecate Chevrolat, 1855
- Ceroplesis hintzi Breuning, 1937
- Ceroplesis hottentotta (Fabricius, 1775)
- Ceroplesis intermedia Aurivillius, 1925
- Ceroplesis marmorata Reiche, 1849
- Ceroplesis massaica Aurivillius, 1908
- Ceroplesis militaris Gerstäcker, 1855
- Ceroplesis millingeni Pic, 1895
- Ceroplesis minuta Jordan, 1894
- Ceroplesis molator (Fabricius, 1787)
- Ceroplesis mucorea (Kolbe, 1893)
- Ceroplesis nigromaculata Aurivillius, 1910
- Ceroplesis orientalis (Herbst, 1786)
- Ceroplesis poggei Harold, 1878
- Ceroplesis quinquefasciata (Fabricius, 1792)
- Ceroplesis reticulata Gahan, 1909
- Ceroplesis revoili Fairmaire, 1882
- Ceroplesis rubrocincta (Hintz, 1911)
- Ceroplesis rubrovariegata Aurivillius, 1925
- Ceroplesis rugosopunctata Aurivillius, 1925
- Ceroplesis scorteccii Breuning, 1940
- Ceroplesis semitrabeata Fairmaire, 1887
- Ceroplesis signata Waterhouse, 1890
- Ceroplesis strandi Breuning, 1935
- Ceroplesis sudanica Aurivillius, 1925
- Ceroplesis sumptuosa Pascoe, 1875
- Ceroplesis suturalis Harold, 1880
- Ceroplesis thunbergii Fahraeus, 1872
