= Ceroplesis hintzi =

Scientific classification
- Kingdom: Animalia
- Phylum: Arthropoda
- Class: Insecta
- Order: Coleoptera
- Suborder: Polyphaga
- Infraorder: Cucujiformia
- Family: Cerambycidae
- Genus: Ceroplesis
- Species: C. hintzi

Binomial name
- Ceroplesis hintzi Breuning, 1937

Synonyms
- Ceroplesis bifasciata Hintz, 1920

Species of beetle

Ceroplesis hintzi is a species of beetle in the family Cerambycidae. It was described by Stephan von Breuning in 1937. It is known from the Democratic Republic of the Congo.
