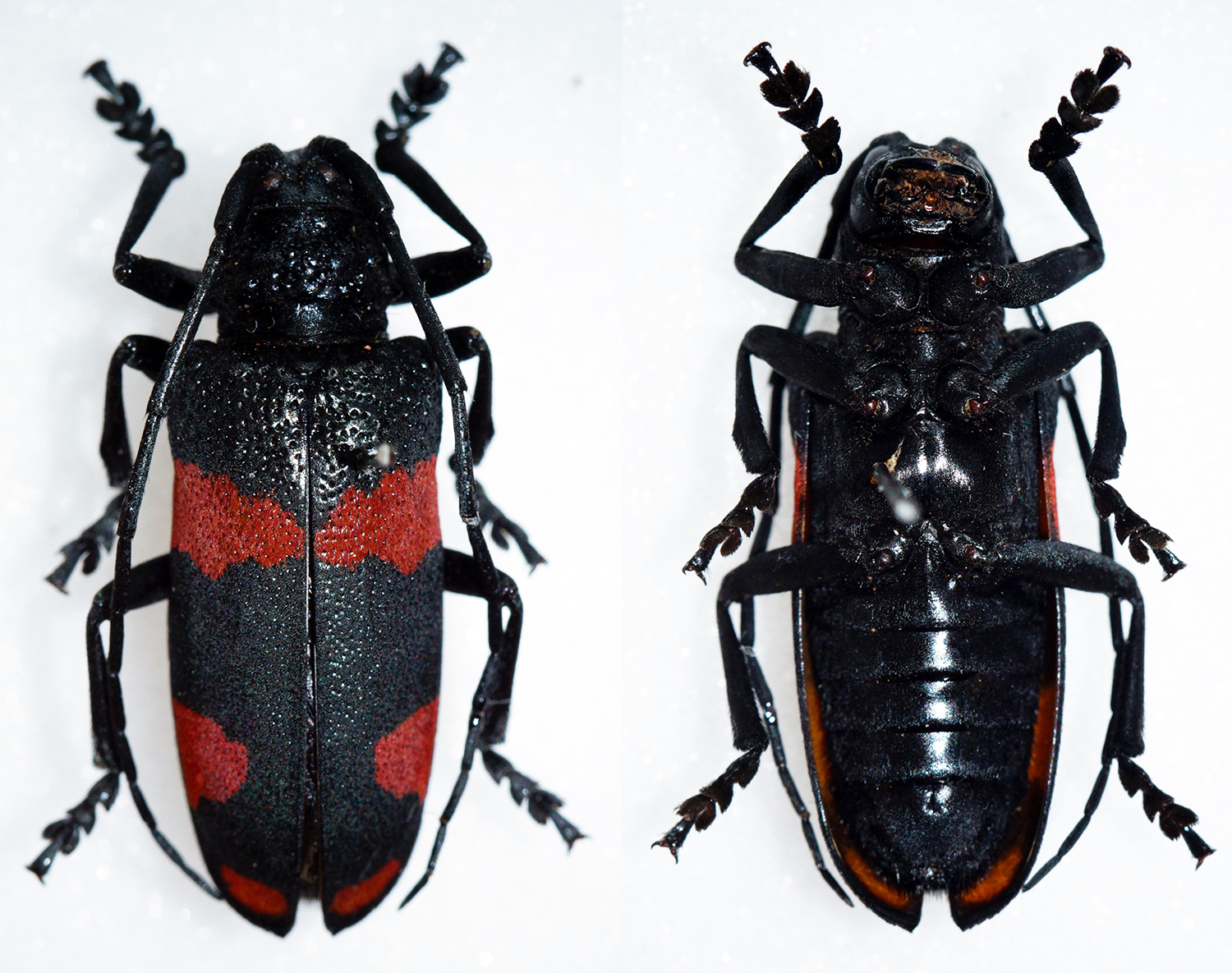

Scientific classification
- Domain: Eukaryota
- Kingdom: Animalia
- Phylum: Arthropoda
- Class: Insecta
- Order: Coleoptera
- Suborder: Polyphaga
- Infraorder: Cucujiformia
- Family: Cerambycidae
- Genus: Ceroplesis
- Species: C. hottentotta

Binomial name
- Ceroplesis hottentotta (Fabricius, 1775)

Synonyms
- Lamia hottentotta Fabricius, 1775; Cerambyx punctatus Brown, 1776 (Preocc.); Cerambyx lanius Voet, 1778 (Unav.); Cerambyx mimosae Thunberg, 1787

= Ceroplesis hottentotta =

Species of beetle

Ceroplesis hottentotta is a species of beetle in the family Cerambycidae. It was described by Johan Christian Fabricius in 1775. It is known from South Africa. It contains the variety Ceroplesis hottentotta var. disjuncta.
