= Ceroplesis mucorea =

Scientific classification
- Kingdom: Animalia
- Phylum: Arthropoda
- Class: Insecta
- Order: Coleoptera
- Suborder: Polyphaga
- Infraorder: Cucujiformia
- Family: Cerambycidae
- Genus: Ceroplesis
- Species: C. mucorea

Binomial name
- Ceroplesis mucorea (Kolbe, 1893)

Species of beetle

Ceroplesis mucorea is a species of beetle in the family Cerambycidae. It was described by Kolbe in 1893. It is known from Tanzania.
