= Ceroplesis nigromaculata =

Scientific classification
- Domain: Eukaryota
- Kingdom: Animalia
- Phylum: Arthropoda
- Class: Insecta
- Order: Coleoptera
- Suborder: Polyphaga
- Infraorder: Cucujiformia
- Family: Cerambycidae
- Genus: Ceroplesis
- Species: C. nigromaculata

Binomial name
- Ceroplesis nigromaculata Aurivillius, 1910

Synonyms
- Ceroplesis rubromaculata Hintz, 1920

Species of beetle

Ceroplesis nigromaculata is a species of beetle in the family Cerambycidae. It was described by Per Olof Christopher Aurivillius in 1910. It is known from Kenya, Uganda, and Tanzania.
