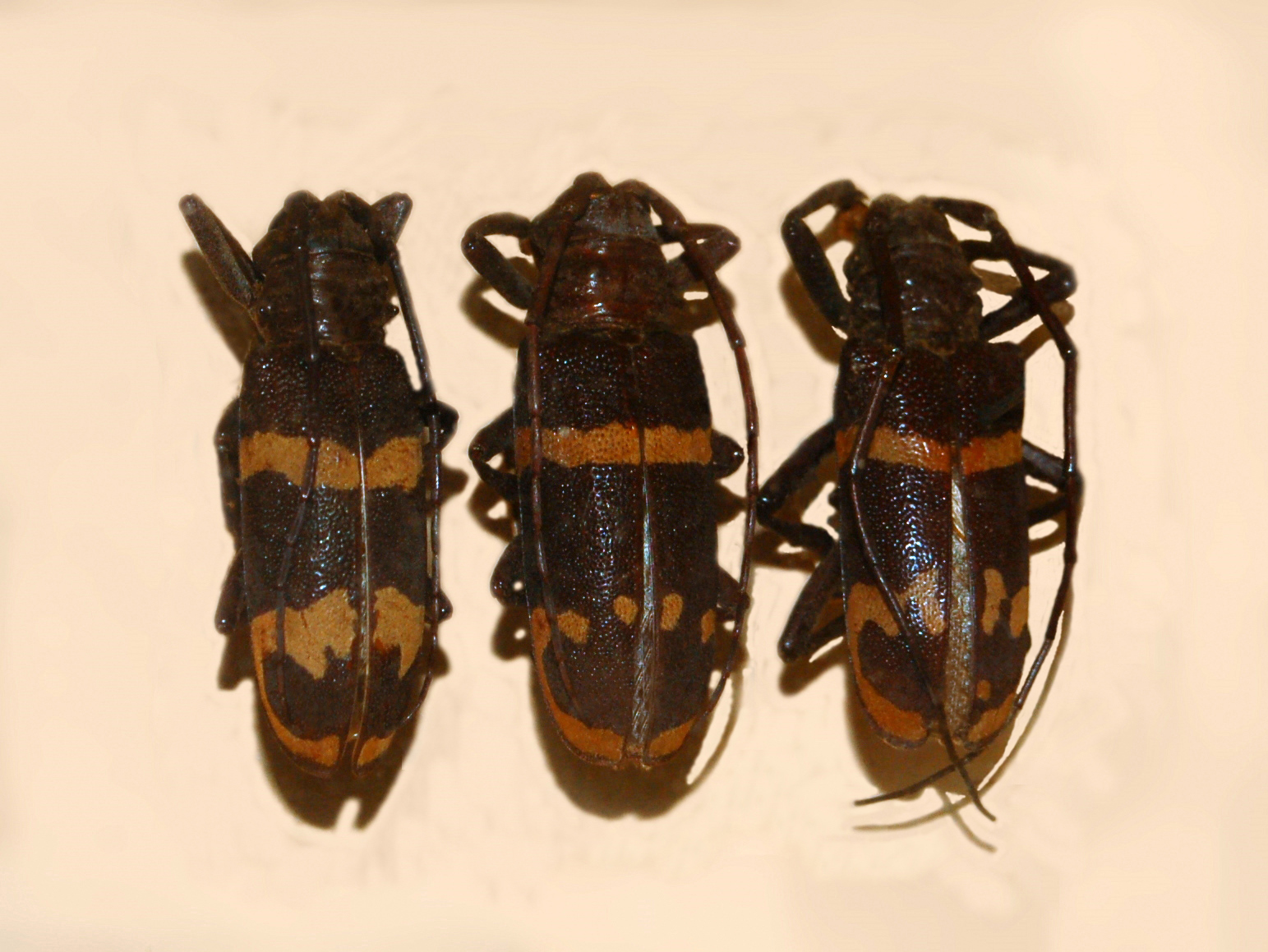
- Cerplesis militaris from Eritrea

Scientific classification
- Kingdom: Animalia
- Phylum: Arthropoda
- Clade: Pancrustacea
- Class: Insecta
- Order: Coleoptera
- Suborder: Polyphaga
- Infraorder: Cucujiformia
- Family: Cerambycidae
- Genus: Ceroplesis
- Species: C. militaris

Binomial name
- Ceroplesis militaris Gerstaecker, 1855

= Ceroplesis militaris =

Species of beetle

Ceroplesis militaris is a species of flat-faced longhorn beetle in the subfamily Lamiinae of the family Cerambycidae.

== Description ==
Ceroplesis militaris reaches about 30 millimetres (1.2 in) in length. The body is black, with two broad stripes crossing the elytra. The host plants include Celtis species, Acacia species and Maesopsis eminii.

== Distribution ==
This species occurs in Democratic Republic of the Congo, Ethiopia, Kenya, Malawi, Mozambique, Namibia, South Africa, Tanzania, Uganda, Zambia and Zimbabwe.

== Subspecies ==
- Ceroplesis militaris irregularis Harold, 1878
- Ceroplesis militaris militaris Gerstäcker, 1855
