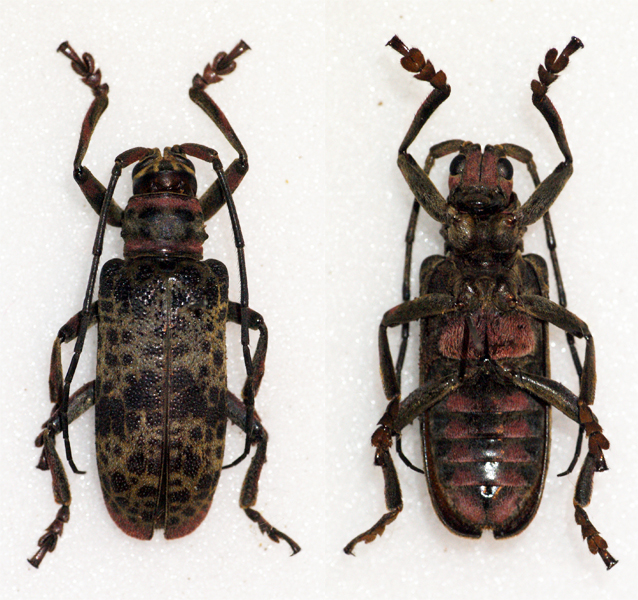

Scientific classification
- Kingdom: Animalia
- Phylum: Arthropoda
- Clade: Pancrustacea
- Class: Insecta
- Order: Coleoptera
- Suborder: Polyphaga
- Infraorder: Cucujiformia
- Family: Cerambycidae
- Genus: Ceroplesis
- Species: C. molator

Binomial name
- Ceroplesis molator (Fabricius, 1787)

Synonyms
- Moecha molator (Fabricius, 1787)

= Ceroplesis molator =

Species of beetle

Ceroplesis molator is a species of beetle in the family Cerambycidae. It was described by Johan Christian Fabricius in 1787. It is known from Ghana, Cameroon, Sierra Leone, Togo, and Senegal. It feeds on Coffea canephora (robusta coffee).
