= Ceroplesis burgeoni =

Scientific classification
- Kingdom: Animalia
- Phylum: Arthropoda
- Class: Insecta
- Order: Coleoptera
- Suborder: Polyphaga
- Infraorder: Cucujiformia
- Family: Cerambycidae
- Genus: Ceroplesis
- Species: C. burgeoni

Binomial name
- Ceroplesis burgeoni Breuning, 1935

Species of beetle

Ceroplesis burgeoni is a species of beetle in the family Cerambycidae. It was described by Breuning in 1935, in the French entomological journal Novitates Entomologicae. It is known from the Democratic Republic of Congo.
