= Ceroplesis hauseri =

Scientific classification
- Domain: Eukaryota
- Kingdom: Animalia
- Phylum: Arthropoda
- Class: Insecta
- Order: Coleoptera
- Suborder: Polyphaga
- Infraorder: Cucujiformia
- Family: Cerambycidae
- Genus: Ceroplesis
- Species: C. hauseri

Binomial name
- Ceroplesis hauseri Hintz, 1910

Synonyms
- Ceroplesis hauseri m. mimanalepta Téocchi, 2001

Species of beetle

Ceroplesis hauseri is a species of beetle in the family Cerambycidae. It was described by Hintz in 1910. It is known from Tanzania, Malawi, and Uganda. It contains the varietas Ceroplesis hauseri var. conjuncta.
