= Ceroplesis reticulata =

Scientific classification
- Domain: Eukaryota
- Kingdom: Animalia
- Phylum: Arthropoda
- Class: Insecta
- Order: Coleoptera
- Suborder: Polyphaga
- Infraorder: Cucujiformia
- Family: Cerambycidae
- Genus: Ceroplesis
- Species: C. reticulata

Binomial name
- Ceroplesis reticulata Gahan, 1909

Species of beetle

Ceroplesis reticulata is a species of beetle in the family Cerambycidae. It was described by Gahan in 1909. It is known from Uganda.
