= Ceroplesis massaica =

Scientific classification
- Domain: Eukaryota
- Kingdom: Animalia
- Phylum: Arthropoda
- Class: Insecta
- Order: Coleoptera
- Suborder: Polyphaga
- Infraorder: Cucujiformia
- Family: Cerambycidae
- Genus: Ceroplesis
- Species: C. massaica

Binomial name
- Ceroplesis massaica Aurivillius, 1908

Synonyms
- Ceroplesis orientalis var. massaica Aurivillius, 1908

Species of beetle

Ceroplesis massaica is a species of beetle in the family Cerambycidae. It was described by Per Olof Christopher Aurivillius in 1908. It is known from Tanzania and Kenya. It contains the variety Ceroplesis massaica var. rufofasciata.
