= Ceroplesis strandi =

Scientific classification
- Kingdom: Animalia
- Phylum: Arthropoda
- Class: Insecta
- Order: Coleoptera
- Suborder: Polyphaga
- Infraorder: Cucujiformia
- Family: Cerambycidae
- Genus: Ceroplesis
- Species: C. strandi

Binomial name
- Ceroplesis strandi Breuning, 1935

Species of beetle

Ceroplesis strandi is a species of beetle in the family Cerambycidae. It was described by Breuning in 1935. It is known from Kenya, Malawi, Tanzania and Zambia.
