= Ceroplesis blairi =

Scientific classification
- Kingdom: Animalia
- Phylum: Arthropoda
- Class: Insecta
- Order: Coleoptera
- Suborder: Polyphaga
- Infraorder: Cucujiformia
- Family: Cerambycidae
- Genus: Ceroplesis
- Species: C. blairi

Binomial name
- Ceroplesis blairi Breuning, 1937

Species of beetle

Ceroplesis blairi is a species of beetle in the family Cerambycidae. It was described by Breuning in 1937. It is known from Sierra Leone and Cameroon.
