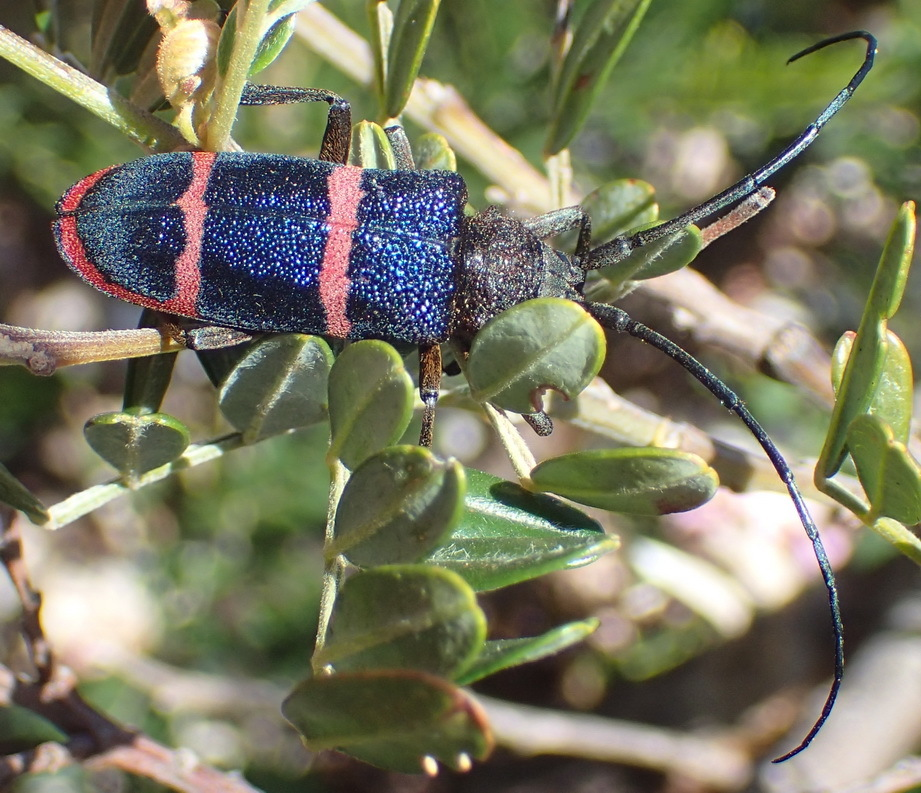

Scientific classification
- Domain: Eukaryota
- Kingdom: Animalia
- Phylum: Arthropoda
- Class: Insecta
- Order: Coleoptera
- Suborder: Polyphaga
- Infraorder: Cucujiformia
- Family: Cerambycidae
- Genus: Ceroplesis
- Species: C. sumptuosa

Binomial name
- Ceroplesis sumptuosa Pascoe, 1875

Synonyms
- Ceroplesis connecta Hintz, 1920; Ceroplesis sumptuosa m. defecta Breuning; Ceroplesis sumptuosa m. reducta Breuning, 1937; Ceroplesis sumptuosa var. collaris Hintz, 1920

= Ceroplesis sumptuosa =

Species of beetle

Ceroplesis sumptuosa is a species of beetle in the family Cerambycidae. It was described by Francis Polkinghorne Pascoe in 1875. It is known from South Africa, Angola, Zimbabwe and Malawi.
