= Ceroplesis arcuata =

Scientific classification
- Domain: Eukaryota
- Kingdom: Animalia
- Phylum: Arthropoda
- Class: Insecta
- Order: Coleoptera
- Suborder: Polyphaga
- Infraorder: Cucujiformia
- Family: Cerambycidae
- Genus: Ceroplesis
- Species: C. arcuata

Binomial name
- Ceroplesis arcuata Harold, 1879

Species of beetle

Ceroplesis arcuata is a species of beetle in the family Cerambycidae. It was described by Harold in 1879. It is known from Angola, the Democratic Republic of the Congo, and Tanzania.
