= Ceroplesis millingeni =

Scientific classification
- Kingdom: Animalia
- Phylum: Arthropoda
- Class: Insecta
- Order: Coleoptera
- Suborder: Polyphaga
- Infraorder: Cucujiformia
- Family: Cerambycidae
- Genus: Ceroplesis
- Species: C. millingeni

Binomial name
- Ceroplesis millingeni Pic, 1895

Species of beetle

Ceroplesis millingeni is a species of beetle in the family Cerambycidae. It was described by Maurice Pic in 1895. It is known from Saudi Arabia and Yemen.
