= Ceroplesis intermedia =

Scientific classification
- Domain: Eukaryota
- Kingdom: Animalia
- Phylum: Arthropoda
- Class: Insecta
- Order: Coleoptera
- Suborder: Polyphaga
- Infraorder: Cucujiformia
- Family: Cerambycidae
- Genus: Ceroplesis
- Species: C. intermedia

Binomial name
- Ceroplesis intermedia Aurivillius, 1925

Species of beetle

Ceroplesis intermedia is a species of beetle in the family Cerambycidae. It was described by Per Olof Christopher Aurivillius in 1925. It is known from Tanzania and Kenya.
