= Ceroplesis griseotincta =

Scientific classification
- Kingdom: Animalia
- Phylum: Arthropoda
- Class: Insecta
- Order: Coleoptera
- Suborder: Polyphaga
- Infraorder: Cucujiformia
- Family: Cerambycidae
- Genus: Ceroplesis
- Species: C. griseotincta

Binomial name
- Ceroplesis griseotincta Fairmaire, 1891

Species of beetle

Ceroplesis griseotincta is a species of beetle in the family Cerambycidae. It was described by Fairmaire in 1891. It is known from Tanzania and Kenya.
