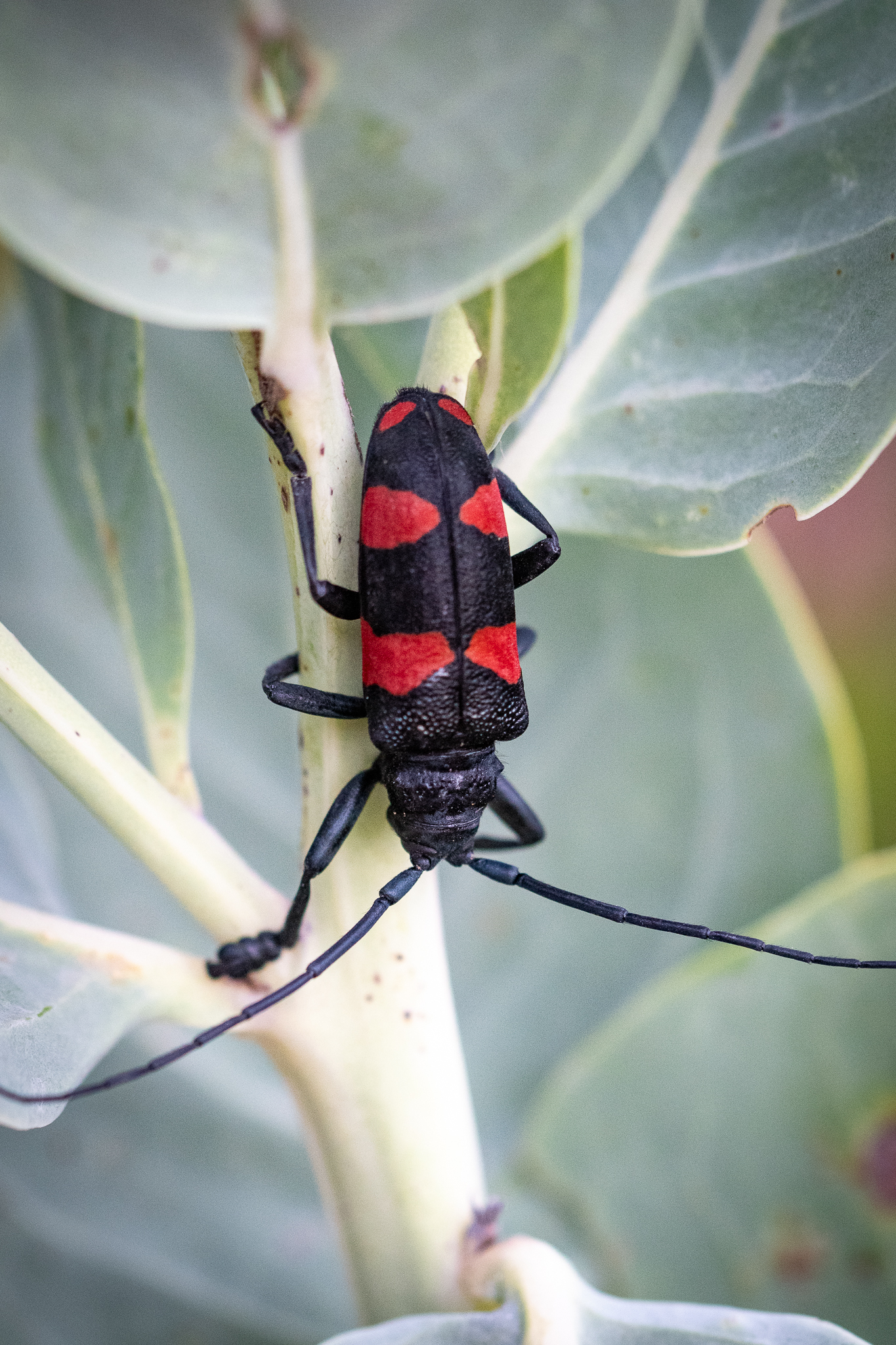
- Ceroplesis aethiops, South Africa

Scientific classification
- Domain: Eukaryota
- Kingdom: Animalia
- Phylum: Arthropoda
- Class: Insecta
- Order: Coleoptera
- Suborder: Polyphaga
- Infraorder: Cucujiformia
- Family: Cerambycidae
- Subfamily: Lamiinae
- Tribe: Ceroplesini
- Genus: Ceroplesis
- Species: C. aethiops

Binomial name
- Ceroplesis aethiops (Fabricius, 1775)

Synonyms
- Lamia aethiops Fabricius, 1775; Cerambyx aurantius Voet, 1778; Cerambyx quadrimaculatus Voet, 1806; Cerambyx trifasciatus Gmelin, 1790; Lamia aethiops Fabricius, 1775; Lamia africana Wulfen, 1786; Lamia leskiana Olivier, 1792

= Ceroplesis aethiops =

Species of beetle

Ceroplesis aethiops, the pea longhorn beetle, is a species of flat-faced longhorn in the family Cerambycidae. It is found in South Africa.
