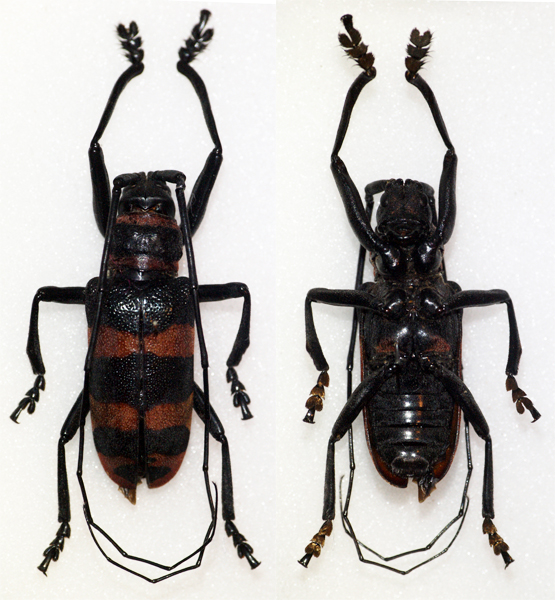

Scientific classification
- Domain: Eukaryota
- Kingdom: Animalia
- Phylum: Arthropoda
- Class: Insecta
- Order: Coleoptera
- Suborder: Polyphaga
- Infraorder: Cucujiformia
- Family: Cerambycidae
- Genus: Ceroplesis
- Species: C. calabarica

Binomial name
- Ceroplesis calabarica Chevrolat, 1858

Synonyms
- Ceroplesis fissa Harold, 1879

= Ceroplesis calabarica =

Species of beetle

Ceroplesis calabarica is a species of beetle in the family Cerambycidae. It was described by Louis Alexandre Auguste Chevrolat in 1858. It is known from Angola, Benin, the Democratic Republic of the Congo, Cameroon, Gabon, Equatorial Guinea, Ghana, Mozambique, Nigeria, Kenya, the Republic of the Congo, Uganda, Togo, and Zambia. Its diet includes Coffea arabica and Coffea canephora.

== Varieties ==
- Ceroplesis calabarica var. congolensis Hintz, 1920
- Ceroplesis calabarica var. immaculata Hintz, 1920
- Ceroplesis calabarica var. mozambica Hintz, 1920
- Ceroplesis calabarica var. transitiva Breuning, 1937
