= Ceroplesis aulica =

Scientific classification
- Domain: Eukaryota
- Kingdom: Animalia
- Phylum: Arthropoda
- Class: Insecta
- Order: Coleoptera
- Suborder: Polyphaga
- Infraorder: Cucujiformia
- Family: Cerambycidae
- Genus: Ceroplesis
- Species: C. aulica

Binomial name
- Ceroplesis aulica Pascoe, 1875

Species of beetle

Ceroplesis aulica is a species of beetle in the family Cerambycidae. It was described by Francis Polkinghorne Pascoe in 1875. It is known from the Republic of Congo, the Democratic Republic of Congo, and Angola.

== Varietas ==
- Ceroplesis aulica var. congoana Fiedler, 1938
- Ceroplesis aulica var. mechowi Quedenfeldt, 1882
- Ceroplesis aulica var. sutureconjuncta Breuning, 1970
