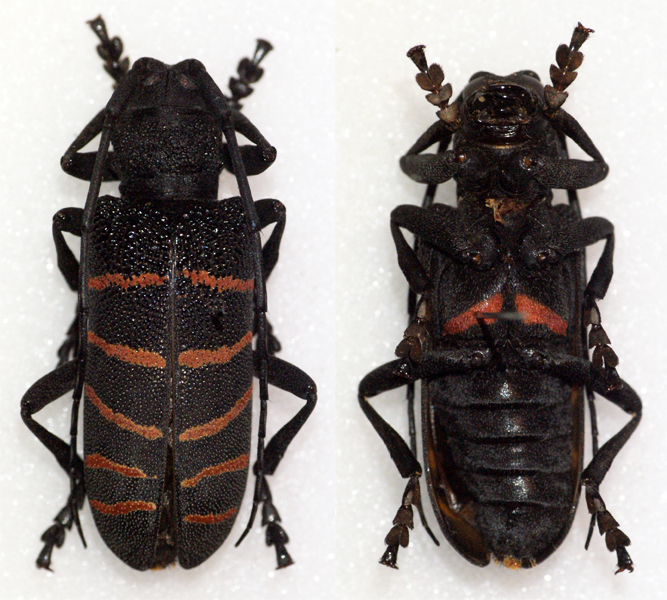

Scientific classification
- Kingdom: Animalia
- Phylum: Arthropoda
- Clade: Pancrustacea
- Class: Insecta
- Order: Coleoptera
- Suborder: Polyphaga
- Infraorder: Cucujiformia
- Family: Cerambycidae
- Genus: Ceroplesis
- Species: C. quinquefasciata

Binomial name
- Ceroplesis quinquefasciata (Fabricius, 1792)

Synonyms
- Lamia quinquefasciata Fabricius, 1792

= Ceroplesis quinquefasciata =

Species of beetle

Ceroplesis quinquefasciata is a species of beetle in the family Cerambycidae. It was described by Johan Christian Fabricius in 1792. It is known from Angola, the Democratic Republic of the Congo, the Central African Republic, Cameroon, the Republic of the Congo, Equatorial Guinea, Ethiopia, Saudi Arabia, South Africa, Senegal, Togo, Tanzania, Zambia, and Uganda.

== Subspecies ==
- Ceroplesis quinquefasciata atropos Fairmaire, 1882
- Ceroplesis quinquefasciata quinquefasciata (Fabricius, 1792)
