= Ceroplesis aethiopica =

Scientific classification
- Kingdom: Animalia
- Phylum: Arthropoda
- Class: Insecta
- Order: Coleoptera
- Suborder: Polyphaga
- Infraorder: Cucujiformia
- Family: Cerambycidae
- Genus: Ceroplesis
- Species: C. aethiopica

Binomial name
- Ceroplesis aethiopica Breuning, 1973

Species of beetle

Ceroplesis aethiopica is a species of beetle in the family Cerambycidae. It was described by Breuning in 1974. It is known from Ethiopia.
