= Corus collaris =

Scientific classification
- Kingdom: Animalia
- Phylum: Arthropoda
- Class: Insecta
- Order: Coleoptera
- Suborder: Polyphaga
- Infraorder: Cucujiformia
- Family: Cerambycidae
- Tribe: Ceroplesini
- Subtribe: Crossotina
- Genus: Corus
- Species: C. collaris

Binomial name
- Corus collaris (Chevrolat, 1856)

Species of beetle

Corus collaris is a species of beetle in the family Cerambycidae. It was described by Chevrolat in 1856. It feeds on Acacia plants.
