= Corus breuningi =

Scientific classification
- Kingdom: Animalia
- Phylum: Arthropoda
- Class: Insecta
- Order: Coleoptera
- Suborder: Polyphaga
- Infraorder: Cucujiformia
- Family: Cerambycidae
- Tribe: Ceroplesini
- Subtribe: Crossotina
- Genus: Corus
- Species: C. breuningi

Binomial name
- Corus breuningi Lepesme, 1943

Species of beetle

Corus breuningi is a species of beetle in the family Cerambycidae. It was described by Lepesme in 1943.
