= Corus thoracalis =

Scientific classification
- Domain: Eukaryota
- Kingdom: Animalia
- Phylum: Arthropoda
- Class: Insecta
- Order: Coleoptera
- Suborder: Polyphaga
- Infraorder: Cucujiformia
- Family: Cerambycidae
- Subfamily: Lamiinae
- Tribe: Ceroplesini
- Subtribe: Crossotina
- Genus: Corus
- Species: C. thoracalis

Binomial name
- Corus thoracalis (Jordan, 1894)

Synonyms
- Corus thoracicalis Teocchi et al., 2009; Corus compactus Lepesme, 1943; Hecyrofrea conradti Breuning, 1961; Praonethida thoracalis Jordan, 1894; Theticus compactus Hintz, 1919

Species of beetles

Corus thoracalis is a species of long-horned beetle in the family Cerambycidae, found in the Afrotropics.

This species was described by Karl Jordan in 1894.
