= Corus monodi =

Scientific classification
- Kingdom: Animalia
- Phylum: Arthropoda
- Class: Insecta
- Order: Coleoptera
- Suborder: Polyphaga
- Infraorder: Cucujiformia
- Family: Cerambycidae
- Subfamily: Lamiinae
- Tribe: Ceroplesini
- Subtribe: Crossotina
- Genus: Corus
- Species: C. monodi

Binomial name
- Corus monodi Lepesme & Breuning, 1953

Species of beetle

Corus monodi is a species of beetle in the family Cerambycidae. It was described by Lepesme and Breuning in 1953.
