= Corus lesnei =

Scientific classification
- Kingdom: Animalia
- Phylum: Arthropoda
- Class: Insecta
- Order: Coleoptera
- Suborder: Polyphaga
- Infraorder: Cucujiformia
- Family: Cerambycidae
- Subfamily: Lamiinae
- Tribe: Ceroplesini
- Subtribe: Crossotina
- Genus: Corus
- Species: C. lesnei

Binomial name
- Corus lesnei (Breuning, 1936)

Species of beetle

Corus lesnei is a species of beetle in the family Cerambycidae. It was described by Stephan von Breuning in 1936.
