= Corus albithorax =

Scientific classification
- Kingdom: Animalia
- Phylum: Arthropoda
- Class: Insecta
- Order: Coleoptera
- Suborder: Polyphaga
- Infraorder: Cucujiformia
- Family: Cerambycidae
- Tribe: Ceroplesini
- Subtribe: Crossotina
- Genus: Corus
- Species: C. albithorax

Binomial name
- Corus albithorax Breuning, 1960

Species of beetle

Corus albithorax is a species of beetle in the family Cerambycidae. It was described by Breuning in 1960.

== Subspecies ==
- Corus albithorax albicollis (Breuning, 1970)
- Corus albithorax albithorax Breuning, 1960
