= Corus caffer =

Scientific classification
- Kingdom: Animalia
- Phylum: Arthropoda
- Class: Insecta
- Order: Coleoptera
- Suborder: Polyphaga
- Infraorder: Cucujiformia
- Family: Cerambycidae
- Tribe: Ceroplesini
- Subtribe: Crossotina
- Genus: Corus
- Species: C. caffer

Binomial name
- Corus caffer Fahraeus, 1872

Species of beetle

Corus caffer is a species of beetle in the family Cerambycidae. It was described by Fahraeus in 1872. It feeds on Acacia plants.
