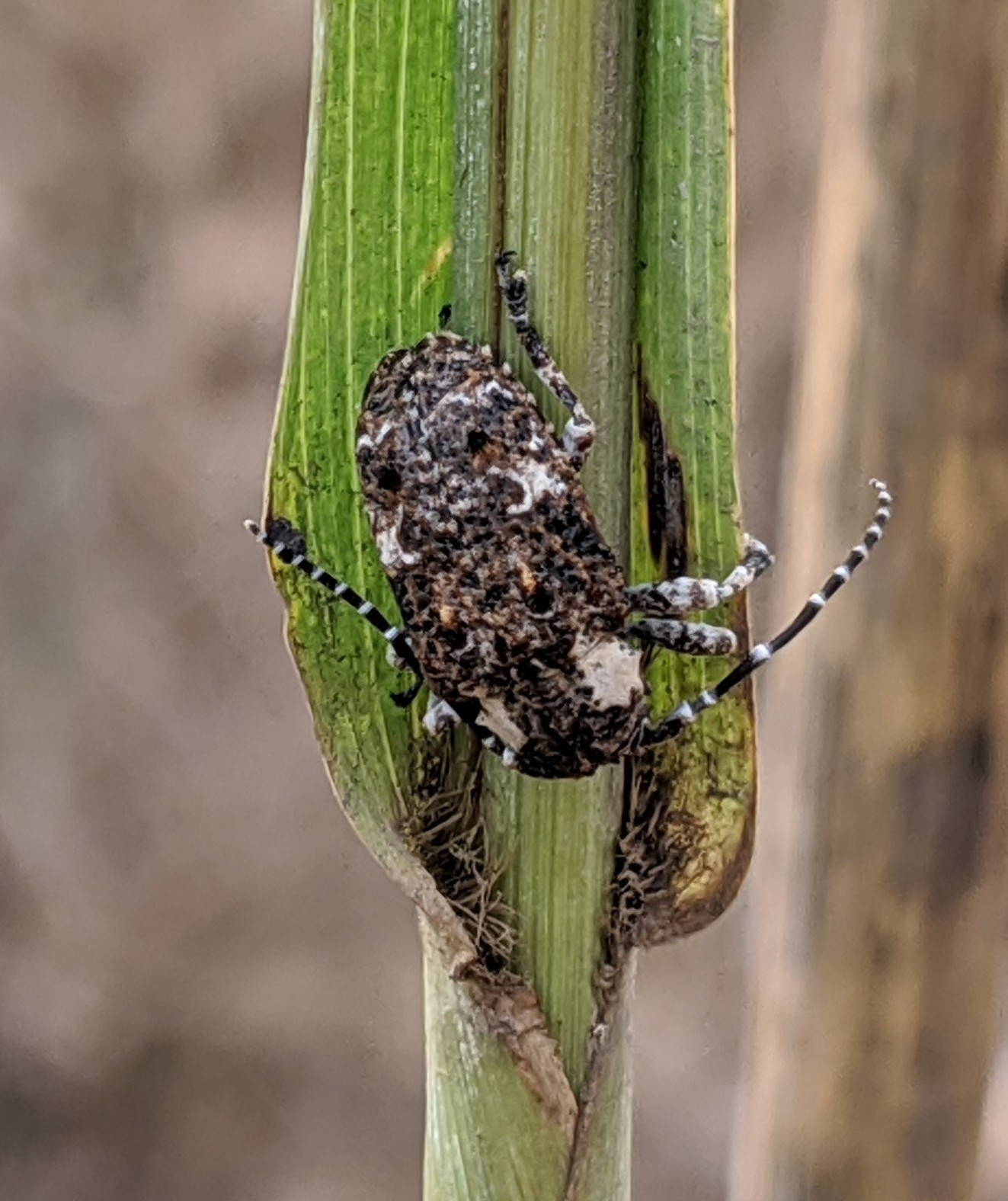
- Corus collaris, Ghana

Scientific classification
- Kingdom: Animalia
- Phylum: Arthropoda
- Class: Insecta
- Order: Coleoptera
- Suborder: Polyphaga
- Infraorder: Cucujiformia
- Family: Cerambycidae
- Subfamily: Lamiinae
- Tribe: Ceroplesini
- Subtribe: Crossotina
- Genus: Corus; Pascoe, 1888

Synonyms
- Praonethida Jordan, 1894

= Corus (beetle) =

Genus of beetles

Corus is a genus of long-horned beetles in the family Cerambycidae. There are more than 30 described species in Corus.

The name Corus may be an invalid junior homonym of Corus Jousseaume, 1877, though the latter may have been in error for Borus Albers, 1850.

== Species ==
These 36 species belong to the genus Corus:

- Corus albithorax Breuning, 1960 (Afrotropics)
- Corus albomarmoratus Breuning, 1949 (Kenya)
- Corus breuningi Lepesme, 1943 (Gabon)
- Corus burgeoni (Breuning, 1935) (Malawi, DR Congo)
- Corus cachani Breuning, 1962 (Ivory Coast)
- Corus caffer (Fåhraeus, 1872) (Afrotropics)
- Corus collaris (Chevrolat, 1856) (Afrotropics)
- Corus corticarius (Hintz, 1910) (Tanzania)
- Corus costiger (Quedenfeldt, 1883) (Afrotropics)
- Corus cretaceus (Chevrolat, 1858) (Afrotropics)
- Corus cylindricus (Breuning, 1935) (DR Congo)
- Corus exiguus Breuning, 1939 (Kenya)
- Corus fasciculosus (Aurivillius, 1903) (Africa)
- Corus flavus (Breuning, 1935) (DR Congo)
- Corus laevepunctatus Breuning, 1938 (Angola)
- Corus laevidorsis (Kolbe, 1893) (Kenya, Tanzania)
- Corus laevifrons Breuning, 1947 (Tanzania)
- Corus latus Breuning, 1938 (Sénégal)
- Corus leonensis (Breuning, 1935) (Burkina Faso, Ivory Coast, and Sierra Leone)
- Corus lesnei (Breuning, 1936) (Central African Republic, DR Congo)
- Corus luridus Breuning, 1938 (Chad)
- Corus microphthalmus Hunt & Breuning, 1957 (South Africa)
- Corus moisescoi Lepesme, 1946 (Tanzania)
- Corus monodi Lepesme & Breuning, 1953 (Equatorial Guinea)
- Corus nyassanus Breuning, 1938 (Malawi)
- Corus obscurus Breuning, 1938 (Zimbabwe)
- Corus olivaceus Breuning, 1969 (Cameroon)
- Corus parallelus (Breuning, 1935) (Uganda, DR Congo)
- Corus parvus Breuning, 1938 (Zimbabwe)
- Corus plurifasciculatus Breuning, 1950 (Africa)
- Corus pseudocaffer (Breuning, 1936) (Botswana, Malawi, Mozambique, South Africa)
- Corus pseudocostiger (Breuning, 1936) (Afrotropics)
- Corus raffrayi Breuning, 1970 (Ethiopia)
- Corus strandiellus (Breuning, 1935) (Tanzania)
- Corus thoracalis (Jordan, 1894) (Afrotropics)
- Corus tubericollis Breuning, 1981 (South Africa)
