= Corus nyassanus =

Scientific classification
- Kingdom: Animalia
- Phylum: Arthropoda
- Class: Insecta
- Order: Coleoptera
- Suborder: Polyphaga
- Infraorder: Cucujiformia
- Family: Cerambycidae
- Subfamily: Lamiinae
- Tribe: Ceroplesini
- Subtribe: Crossotina
- Genus: Corus
- Species: C. nyassanus

Binomial name
- Corus nyassanus Breuning, 1938

Species of beetle

Corus nyassanus is a species of beetle in the family Cerambycidae. It was described by Breuning in 1938. The species has been reported in Malawi.

Corus nyassanus measures about 12 mm (0.47 in) in length.
