= Corus flavus =

Scientific classification
- Kingdom: Animalia
- Phylum: Arthropoda
- Class: Insecta
- Order: Coleoptera
- Suborder: Polyphaga
- Infraorder: Cucujiformia
- Family: Cerambycidae
- Subfamily: Lamiinae
- Tribe: Ceroplesini
- Subtribe: Crossotina
- Genus: Corus
- Species: C. flavus

Binomial name
- Corus flavus (Breuning, 1935)

Species of beetle

Corus flavus is a species of beetle in the family Cerambycidae. It was described by Breuning in 1935.
