= Corus fasciculosus =

Scientific classification
- Kingdom: Animalia
- Phylum: Arthropoda
- Class: Insecta
- Order: Coleoptera
- Suborder: Polyphaga
- Infraorder: Cucujiformia
- Family: Cerambycidae
- Subfamily: Lamiinae
- Tribe: Ceroplesini
- Subtribe: Crossotina
- Genus: Corus
- Species: C. fasciculosus

Binomial name
- Corus fasciculosus (Aurivillius, 1903)

Synonyms
- Eumimetes fasciculosus Aurivillius, 1903

Species of beetle

Corus fasciculosus is a species of beetle in the family Cerambycidae. It was described by Per Olof Christopher Aurivillius in 1903. It is known from Cameroon and the Democratic Republic of the Congo.
