= Corus raffrayi =

Scientific classification
- Kingdom: Animalia
- Phylum: Arthropoda
- Class: Insecta
- Order: Coleoptera
- Suborder: Polyphaga
- Infraorder: Cucujiformia
- Family: Cerambycidae
- Subfamily: Lamiinae
- Tribe: Ceroplesini
- Subtribe: Crossotina
- Genus: Corus
- Species: C. raffrayi

Binomial name
- Corus raffrayi Breuning, 1970

Species of beetle

Corus raffrayi is a species of beetle in the family Cerambycidae. It was described by Breuning in 1970.
