= Gnathoenia alboplagiata =

Scientific classification
- Kingdom: Animalia
- Phylum: Arthropoda
- Class: Insecta
- Order: Coleoptera
- Suborder: Polyphaga
- Infraorder: Cucujiformia
- Family: Cerambycidae
- Genus: Gnathoenia
- Species: G. alboplagiata

Binomial name
- Gnathoenia alboplagiata Jordan, 1894

Synonyms
- Gnathoenia venerea ab. alboplagiata Jordan, 1894

Species of beetle

Gnathoenia alboplagiata is a species of beetle in the family Cerambycidae. It was described by Karl Jordan in 1894.
