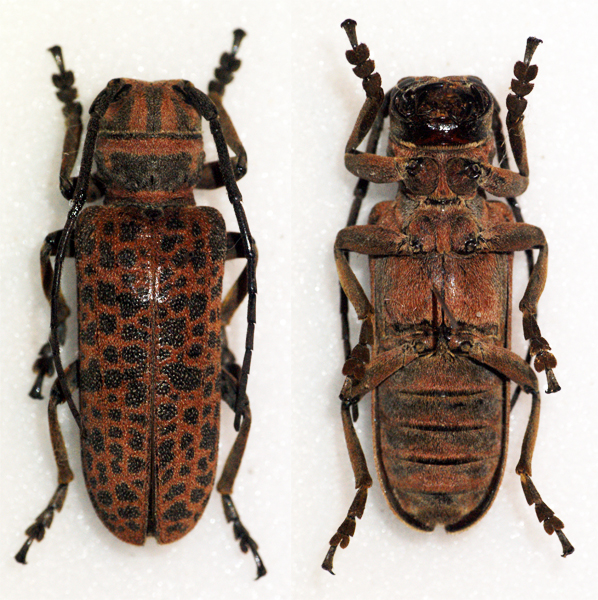

Scientific classification
- Domain: Eukaryota
- Kingdom: Animalia
- Phylum: Arthropoda
- Class: Insecta
- Order: Coleoptera
- Suborder: Polyphaga
- Infraorder: Cucujiformia
- Family: Cerambycidae
- Genus: Cochliopalpus
- Species: C. suturalis

Binomial name
- Cochliopalpus suturalis Harold, 1880

= Cochliopalpus suturalis =

Species of beetle

Cochliopalpus suturalis is a species of beetle in the family Cerambycidae. It was described by Harold in 1880.
