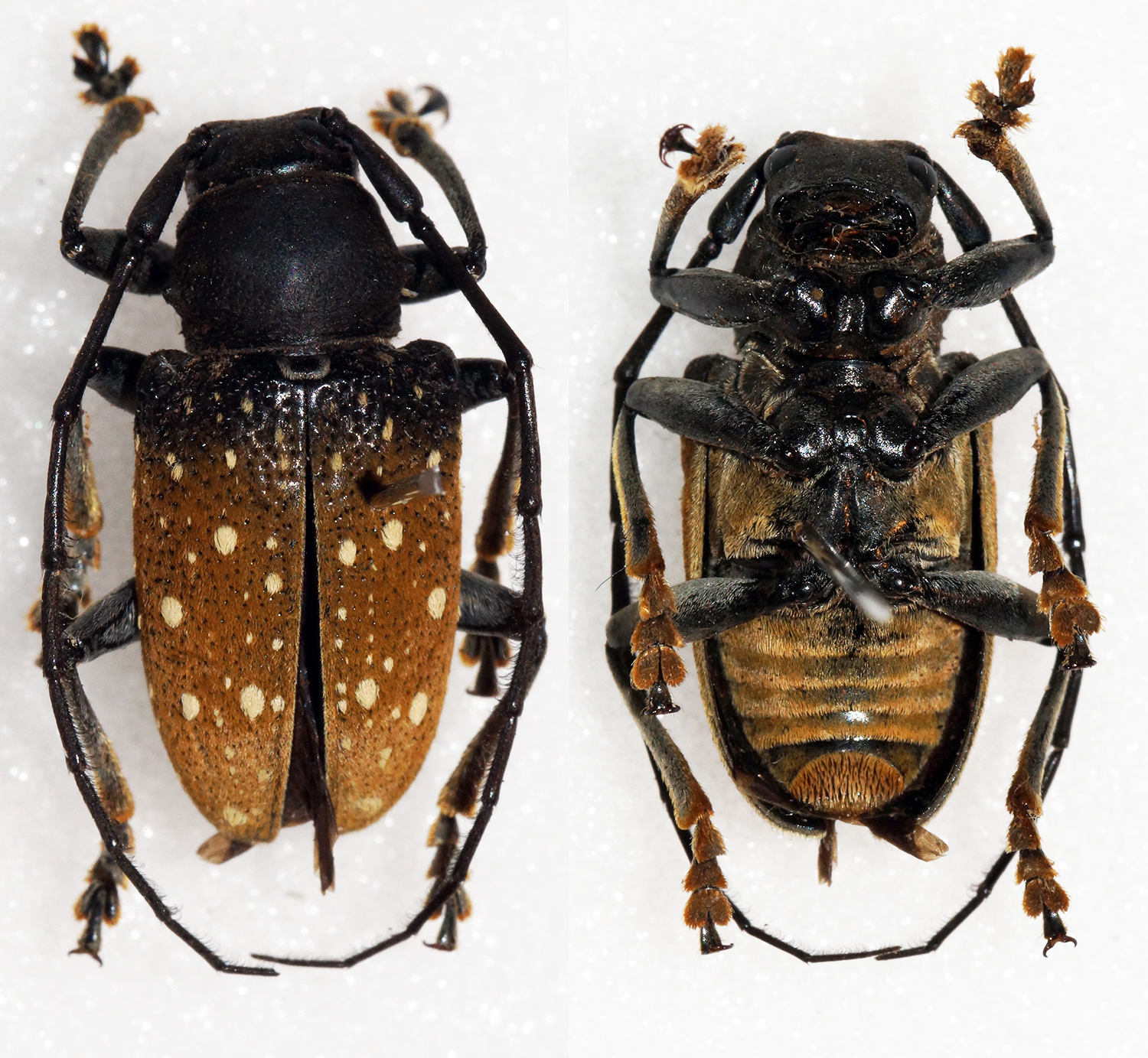

Scientific classification
- Kingdom: Animalia
- Phylum: Arthropoda
- Class: Insecta
- Order: Coleoptera
- Suborder: Polyphaga
- Infraorder: Cucujiformia
- Family: Cerambycidae
- Genus: Gnathoenia
- Species: G. albomaculata

Binomial name
- Gnathoenia albomaculata Quedenfeldt, 1881

Synonyms
- Gnathoenia albomaculata Quedenfeldt, 1881

= Gnathoenia albomaculata =

Species of beetle

Gnathoenia albomaculata is a species of beetle in the family Cerambycidae. It was described by Quedenfeldt in 1881. It is known from Angola and the Democratic Republic of the Congo.
