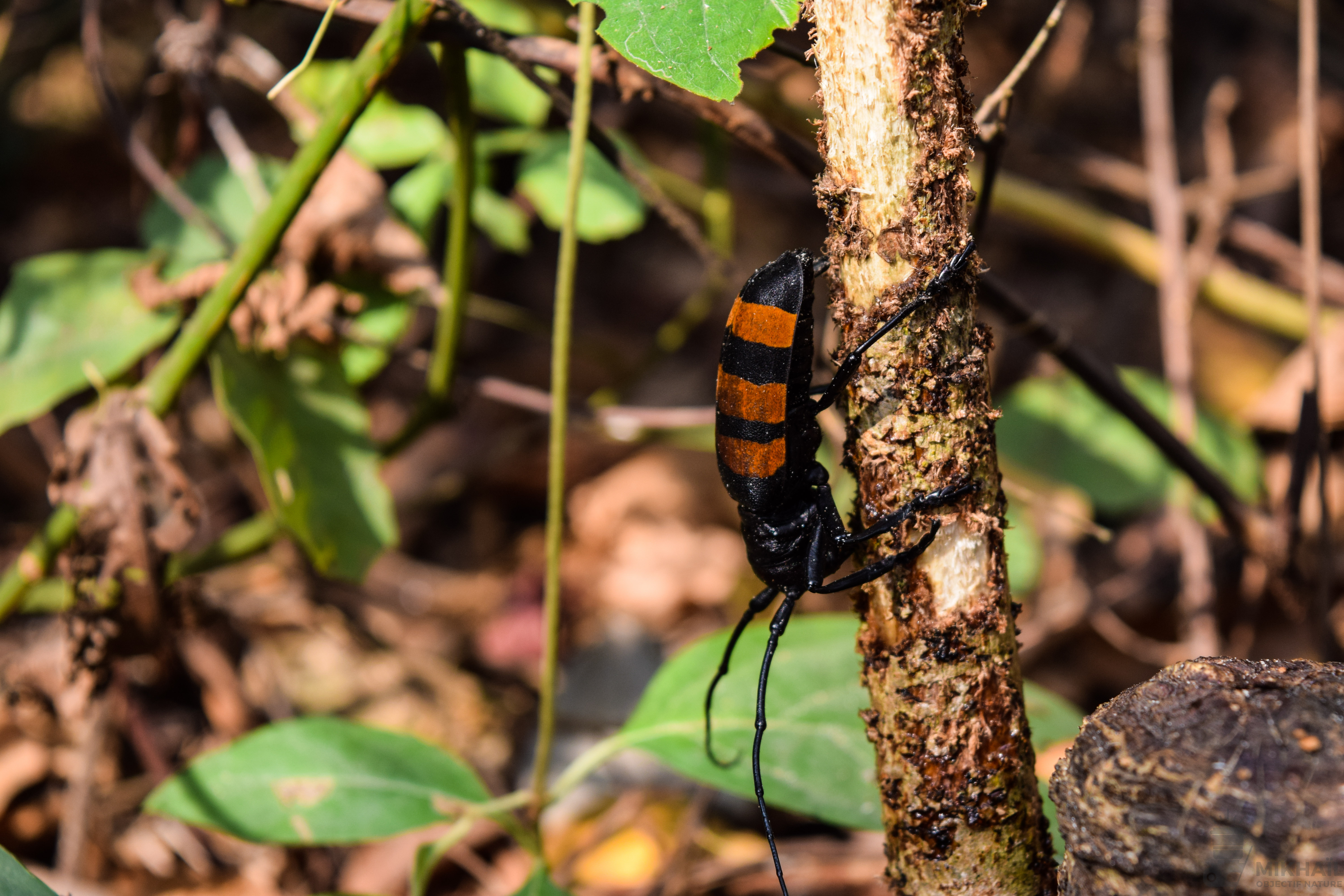

Scientific classification
- Kingdom: Animalia
- Phylum: Arthropoda
- Class: Insecta
- Order: Coleoptera
- Suborder: Polyphaga
- Infraorder: Cucujiformia
- Family: Cerambycidae
- Tribe: Ceroplesini
- Genus: Diastocera; Dejean, 1835
- Species: D. trifasciata

Binomial name
- Diastocera trifasciata (Fabricius, 1775)

Synonyms
- Analeptes Gistel, 1847; Lamia trifasciata Fabricius, 1775; Lamia obesa Voet, 1778; Cerambyx trifasciatus; Ceroplesis trifasciatus; Ceroplesis trifasciata; Analeptes trifasciatus; Analeptes trifasciata

= Diastocera =

Genus of beetles

Diastocera is a monotypic genus in the family Cerambycidae described by Pierre François Marie Auguste Dejean in 1835. Its only species, the African Diastocera trifasciata, was described by Johan Christian Fabricius in 1775, but the Asian Thysia wallichii has on occasion been placed in the genus.

== Description ==
Adult Diastocera trifasciata are 3.1–4.7 centimetres (1.2–1.9 in) in length, with males averaging larger than females and having clearly longer antennae. The basic colour of the body is black, with three reddish-orange bands across the elytra (hence the Latin species name trifasciata). The black antennae are kept flat along the back and extend beyond the abdomen.

Adults and larvae of Diastocera trifasciata feed on the bark and underlying wood of Adansonia digitata, Anacardium occidentale, Annona senegalensis, Ceiba pentandra, Eucalyptus camaldulensis, Eucalyptus globulus, Eucalyptus saligna, Sclerocarya birrea, Spondias mombin, Sterculia setigera, Sterculia tragacantha. Infestation of this insect may have devastating effects on cashew (Anacardium occidentale), with relevant economic damages.

== Distribution ==
This species can be found in Central Africa (Angola, Benin, Cameroon, Central African Republic, Democratic Republic of the Congo, Ethiopia, Ghana, Ivory Coast, Kenya, Liberia, Niger, Nigeria, Mozambique, Senegal, Sierra Leone and Togo).

== Habitat ==
Diastocera trifasciata is typically an inhabitant of savannah, but it is also present in forests edges with plants of family Anacardiaceae.
