= Gnathoenia congoana =

Scientific classification
- Kingdom: Animalia
- Phylum: Arthropoda
- Class: Insecta
- Order: Coleoptera
- Suborder: Polyphaga
- Infraorder: Cucujiformia
- Family: Cerambycidae
- Genus: Gnathoenia
- Species: G. congoana

Binomial name
- Gnathoenia congoana Belon, 1901

Synonyms
- Gnathoenia congoana m. immaculipennis Breuning, 1966

Species of beetle

Gnathoenia congoana is a species of beetle in the family Cerambycidae. It was described by Belon in 1901. It is known from the Democratic Republic of the Congo. It contains the varietas Gnathoenia congoana var. reticulata.
