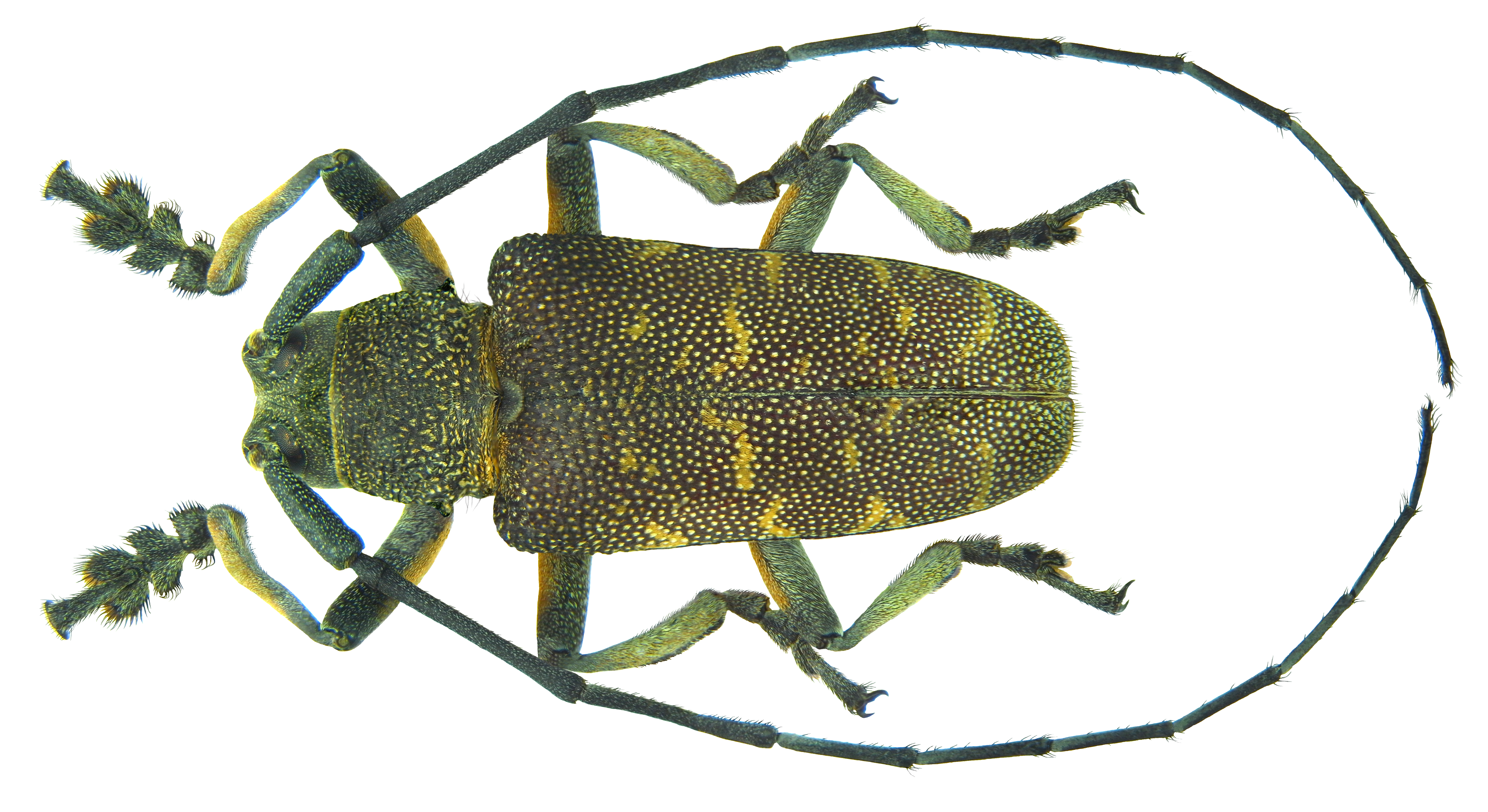

Scientific classification
- Kingdom: Animalia
- Phylum: Arthropoda
- Clade: Pancrustacea
- Class: Insecta
- Order: Coleoptera
- Suborder: Polyphaga
- Infraorder: Cucujiformia
- Family: Cerambycidae
- Tribe: Ceroplesini
- Genus: Titoceres; Audinet-Serville, 1835

Synonyms
- Ceratites Audinet-Serville, 1835; Rangifer Gistel, 1848; Paratitoceres Breuning, 1962

= Titoceres =

Genus of beetles

Titoceres is a genus of beetle in the family Cerambycidae.

== Species ==
- Titoceres arabicus Breuning, 1962
- Titoceres jaspideus (Audinet-Serville, 1835)
