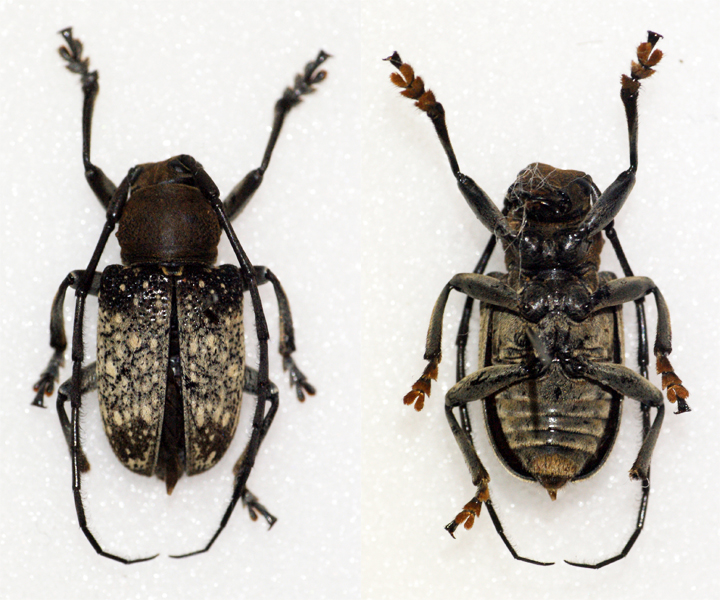

Scientific classification
- Kingdom: Animalia
- Phylum: Arthropoda
- Class: Insecta
- Order: Coleoptera
- Suborder: Polyphaga
- Infraorder: Cucujiformia
- Family: Cerambycidae
- Genus: Gnathoenia
- Species: G. venerea

Binomial name
- Gnathoenia venerea Thomson, 1858

= Gnathoenia venerea =

Species of beetle

Gnathoenia venerea is a species of beetle in the family Cerambycidae. It was described by Thomson in 1858. It is known from Cameroon, the Central African Republic, Angola, Gabon, and the Democratic Republic of the Congo.

== Subspecies ==
- Gnathoenia venerea ivindoensis Breuning, 1954
- Gnathoenia venerea pangalaensis Breuning, 1954
- Gnathoenia venerea venerea Thomson, 1858
