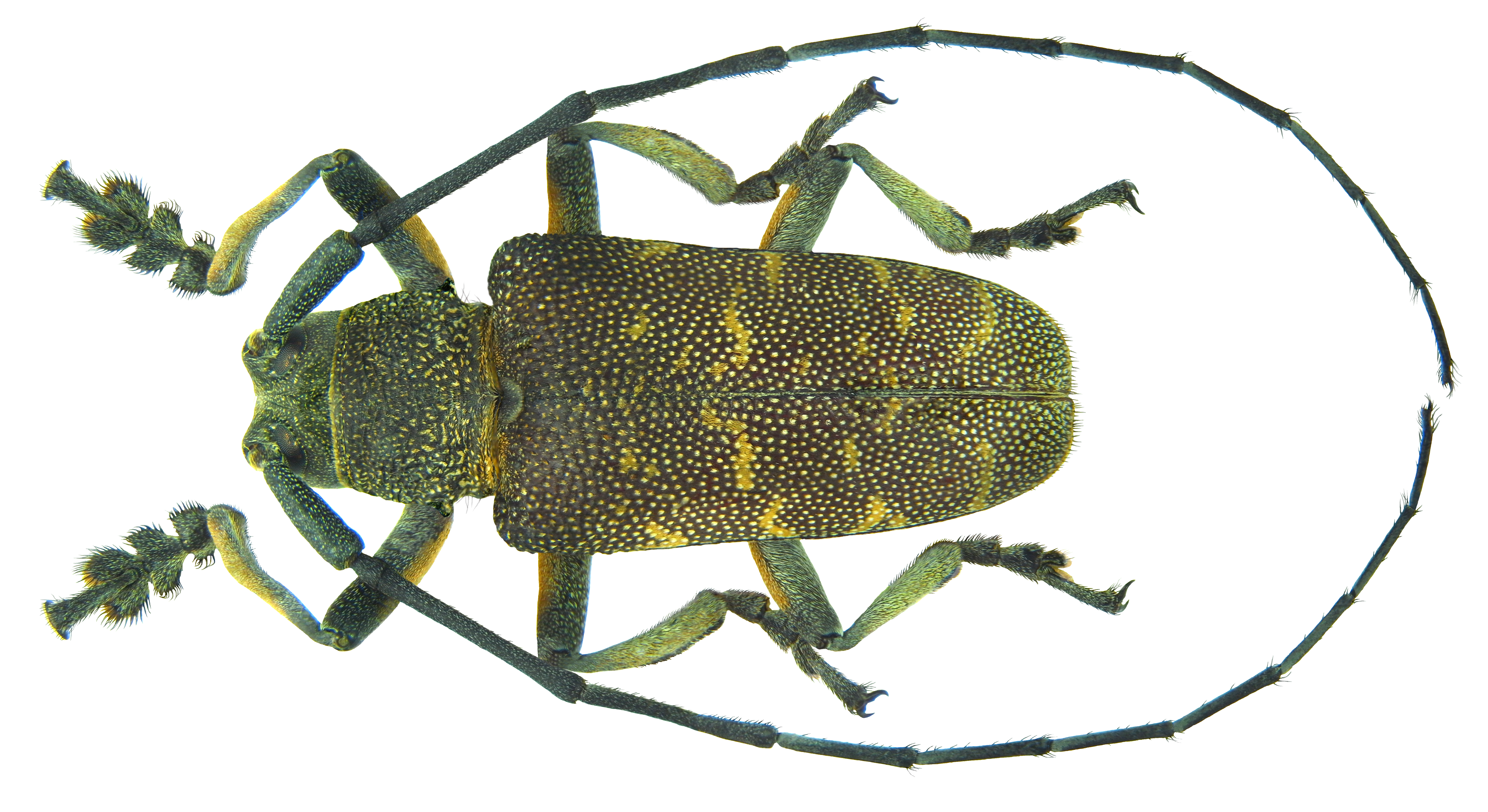

Scientific classification
- Kingdom: Animalia
- Phylum: Arthropoda
- Class: Insecta
- Order: Coleoptera
- Suborder: Polyphaga
- Infraorder: Cucujiformia
- Family: Cerambycidae
- Genus: Titoceres
- Species: T. jaspideus

Binomial name
- Titoceres jaspideus (Audinet-Serville, 1835)

Synonyms
- Ceratites jaspidea Audinet-Serville, 1835

= Titoceres jaspideus =

Species of beetles

Titoceres jaspideus is a species of beetle in the family Cerambycidae. It was described by Audinet-Serville in 1835.
