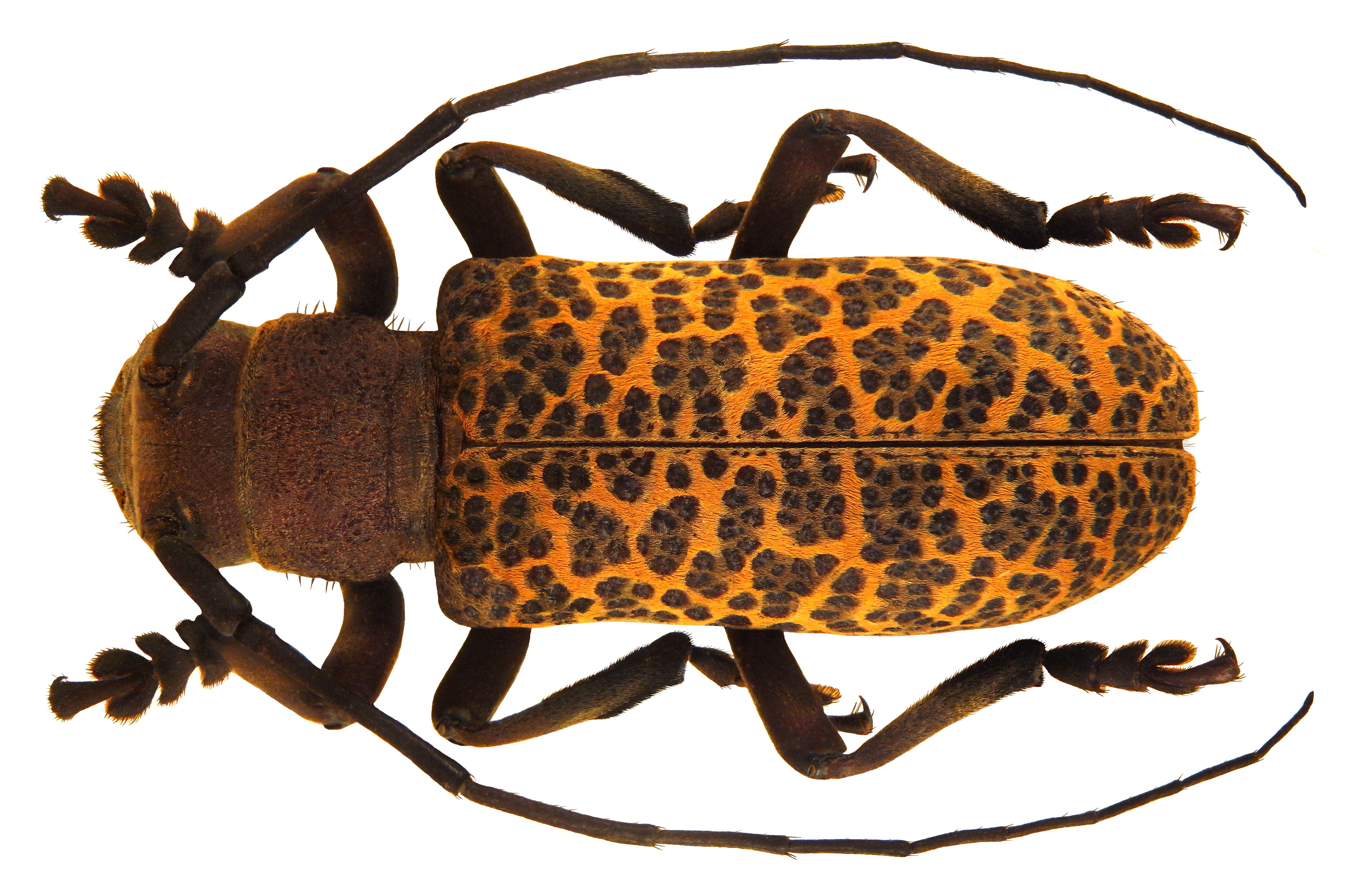

Scientific classification
- Domain: Eukaryota
- Kingdom: Animalia
- Phylum: Arthropoda
- Class: Insecta
- Order: Coleoptera
- Suborder: Polyphaga
- Infraorder: Cucujiformia
- Family: Cerambycidae
- Genus: Paranaleptes
- Species: P. reticulata

Binomial name
- Paranaleptes reticulata (Thomson, 1877)

Synonyms
- Diastocera reticulata Thomson, 1877

= Paranaleptes reticulata =

Species of beetle

Paranaleptes reticulata, known commonly as the Cashew Stem Girdler, is a species of beetle in the family Cerambycidae. It was described by Thomson in 1877. It is known from Ethiopia, Somalia, Kenya, Uganda, and Tanzania.
