= Gnathoenia schoutedeni =

Scientific classification
- Kingdom: Animalia
- Phylum: Arthropoda
- Class: Insecta
- Order: Coleoptera
- Suborder: Polyphaga
- Infraorder: Cucujiformia
- Family: Cerambycidae
- Genus: Gnathoenia
- Species: G. schoutedeni

Binomial name
- Gnathoenia schoutedeni Breuning, 1935

Synonyms
- Frea (Frea) strandi Breuning, 1935; Frea burgeoni Breuning, 1938; Gnathoenia strandi (Breuning) Breuning, 1945

Species of beetle

Gnathoenia schoutedeni is a species of beetle in the family Cerambycidae. It was described by Breuning in 1935. It is known from the Democratic Republic of the Congo.
