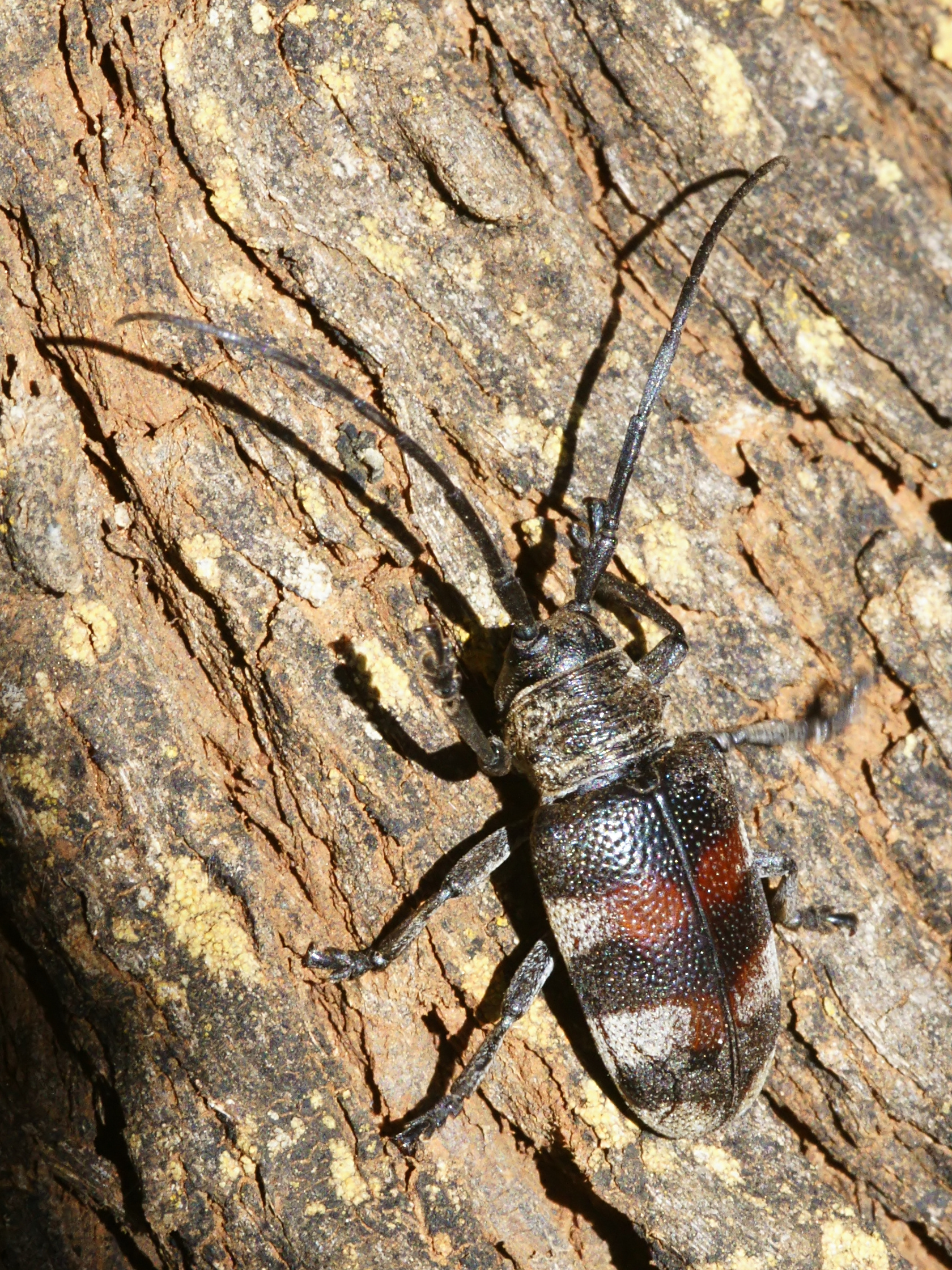
- Pycnopsis brachyptera

Scientific classification
- Kingdom: Animalia
- Phylum: Arthropoda
- Class: Insecta
- Order: Coleoptera
- Suborder: Polyphaga
- Infraorder: Cucujiformia
- Family: Cerambycidae
- Tribe: Ceroplesini
- Genus: Pycnopsis; Thomson, 1857
- Species: P. brachyptera

Binomial name
- Pycnopsis brachyptera Thomson, 1860

= Pycnopsis =

Genus of beetles

Pycnopsis brachyptera is a species of beetle in the family Cerambycidae, and the only species in the genus Pycnopsis. It was described by Thomson in 1860.
