= Gnathoenia bialbata =

Scientific classification
- Kingdom: Animalia
- Phylum: Arthropoda
- Class: Insecta
- Order: Coleoptera
- Suborder: Polyphaga
- Infraorder: Cucujiformia
- Family: Cerambycidae
- Genus: Gnathoenia
- Species: G. bialbata

Binomial name
- Gnathoenia bialbata Fairmaire, 1891

Species of beetle

Gnathoenia bialbata is a species of beetle in the family Cerambycidae. It was described by Fairmaire in 1891. It contains the varietas Gnathoenia bialbata var. latefasciata.
