= Cochliopalpus fimbriatus =

Scientific classification
- Domain: Eukaryota
- Kingdom: Animalia
- Phylum: Arthropoda
- Class: Insecta
- Order: Coleoptera
- Suborder: Polyphaga
- Infraorder: Cucujiformia
- Family: Cerambycidae
- Genus: Cochliopalpus
- Species: C. fimbriatus

Binomial name
- Cochliopalpus fimbriatus Aurivillius, 1928

Species of beetle

Cochliopalpus fimbriatus is a species of beetle in the family Cerambycidae. It was described by Per Olof Christopher Aurivillius in 1928.
