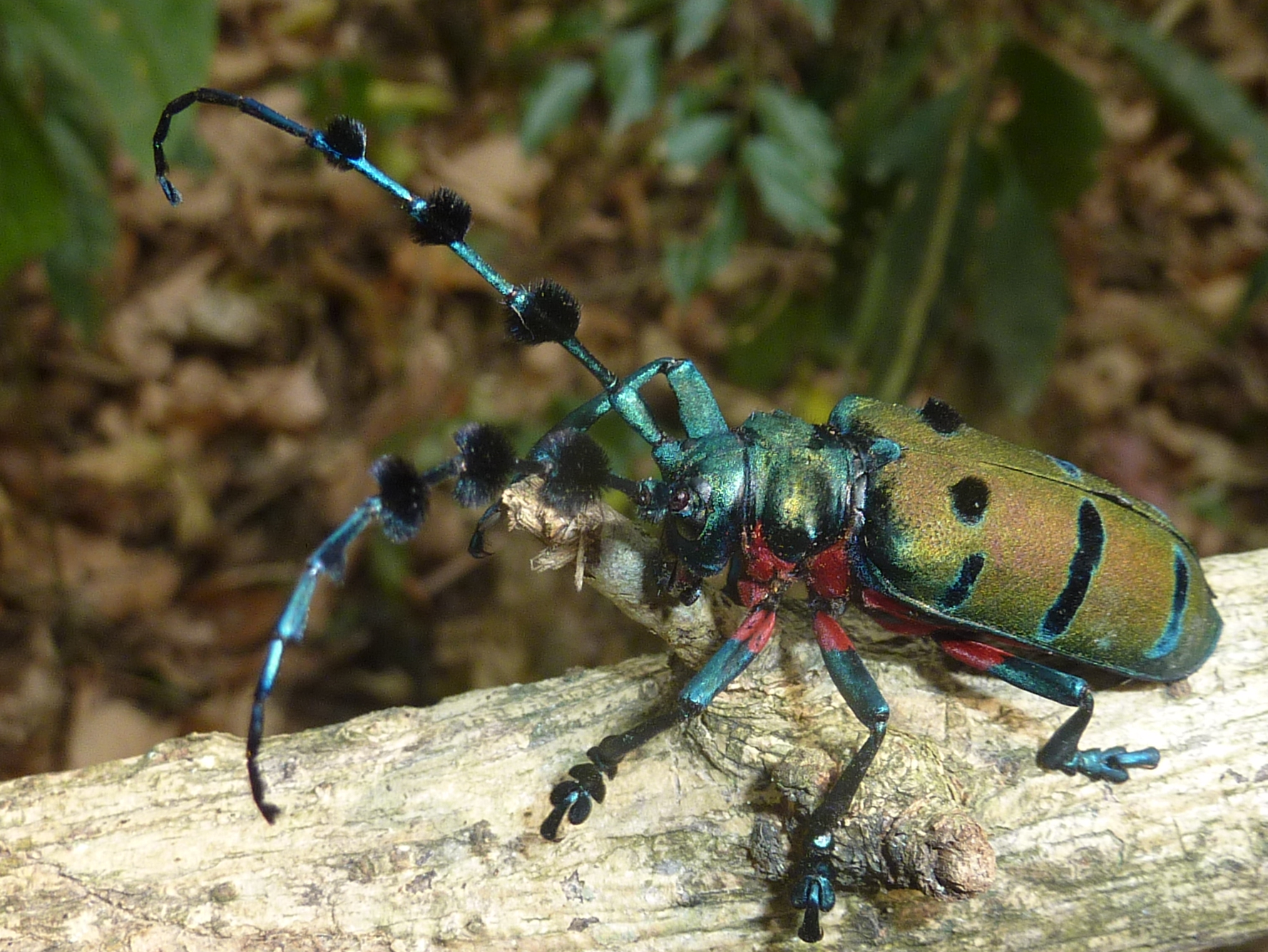

Scientific classification
- Domain: Eukaryota
- Kingdom: Animalia
- Phylum: Arthropoda
- Class: Insecta
- Order: Coleoptera
- Suborder: Polyphaga
- Infraorder: Cucujiformia
- Family: Cerambycidae
- Tribe: Ceroplesini
- Genus: Thysia; Thomson, 1860
- Species: T. wallichii

Binomial name
- Thysia wallichii (Hope, 1831)

Synonyms
- Diastocera Thomson, 1857 (Preoccupied) Unav.; Thysiotes Thomson, 1868; Lamia wallichii Hope, 1831; Lamia tricincta Duncan, 1835; Diastocera wallichii tonkinensis Kreische, 1924; Diastocera wallichii disjuncta Plavilstshikov, 1927; Diastocera wallichii savioi Yen, 1932; Diastocera wallichii insularis Fisher, 1935; Diastocera wallichii dalatensis Breuning, 1968; Diastocera wallichi Auctt. (Lapsus)

= Thysia =

Genus of beetles

Thysia wallichii is a species of longhorn beetle (family Cerambycidae). It is typically 33–40 mm (1.3–1.6 in) long and native to the northern part of South Asia, southern China, Mainland Southeast Asia and the Greater Sundas. It is the only species in the genus Thysia (though sometimes listed by the synonym Diastocera wallichii) and it was described by Hope in 1831.
