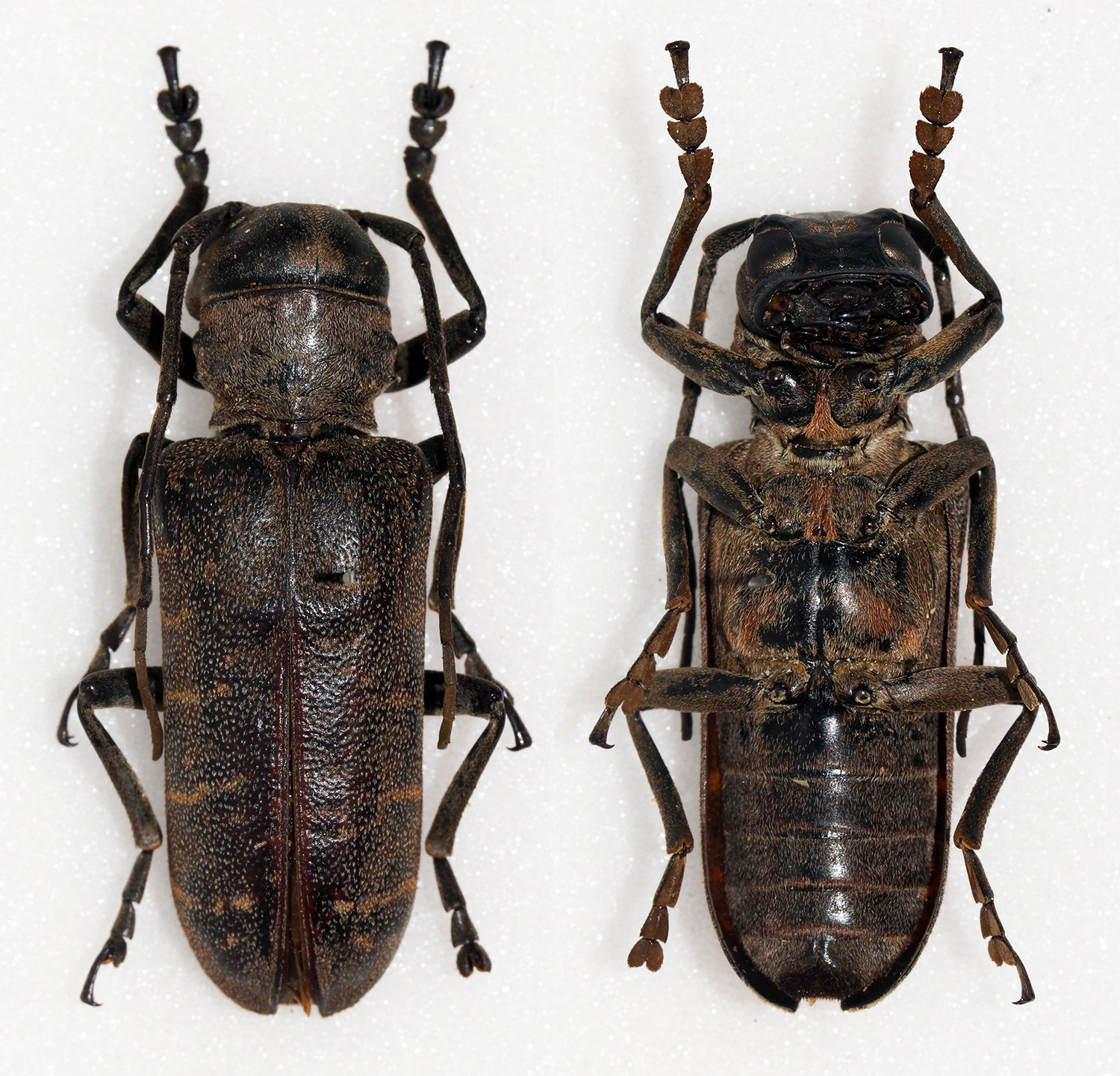

Scientific classification
- Domain: Eukaryota
- Kingdom: Animalia
- Phylum: Arthropoda
- Class: Insecta
- Order: Coleoptera
- Suborder: Polyphaga
- Infraorder: Cucujiformia
- Family: Cerambycidae
- Genus: Cochliopalpus
- Species: C. catherina

Binomial name
- Cochliopalpus catherina (White, 1858)

Synonyms
- Diastocera catherina White, 1858

= Cochliopalpus catherina =

Species of beetle

Cochliopalpus catherina is a species of beetle in the family Cerambycidae. It was described by White in 1858.

== Subspecies ==
- Cochliopalpus catherina catherina (White, 1858)
- Cochliopalpus catherina naivashae Teocchi, 1997
