= Gnathoenia zonifera =

Scientific classification
- Kingdom: Animalia
- Phylum: Arthropoda
- Class: Insecta
- Order: Coleoptera
- Suborder: Polyphaga
- Infraorder: Cucujiformia
- Family: Cerambycidae
- Genus: Gnathoenia
- Species: G. zonifera

Binomial name
- Gnathoenia zonifera Harold, 1879

Species of beetle

Gnathoenia zonifera is a species of beetle in the family Cerambycidae. It was described by Harold in 1879. It is known to be from Angola.
