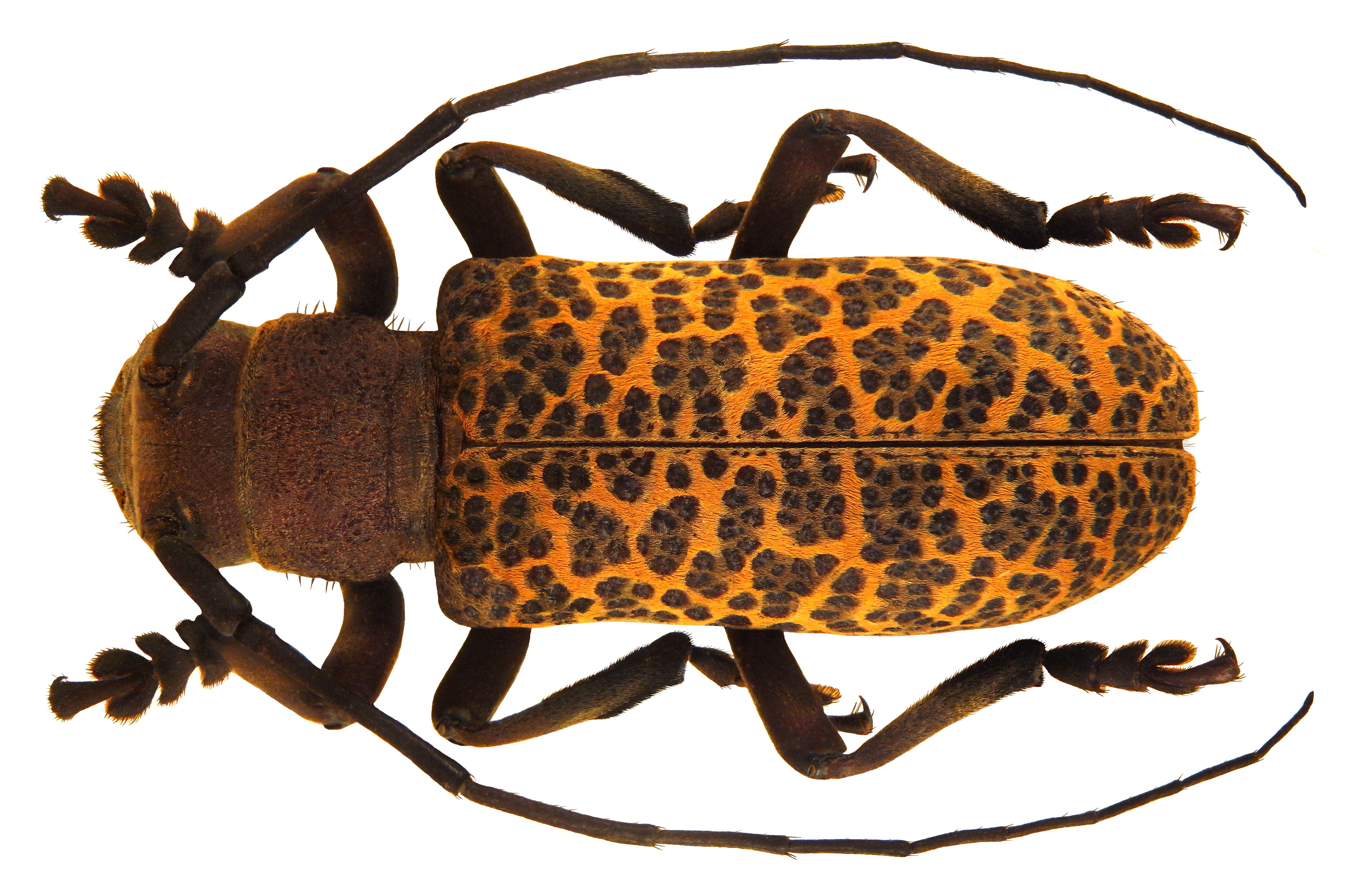
- Paranaleptes reticulata

Scientific classification
- Domain: Eukaryota
- Kingdom: Animalia
- Phylum: Arthropoda
- Class: Insecta
- Order: Coleoptera
- Suborder: Polyphaga
- Infraorder: Cucujiformia
- Family: Cerambycidae
- Tribe: Ceroplesini
- Genus: Paranaleptes

= Paranaleptes =

Genus of beetles

Paranaleptes is a genus of longhorn beetles of the subfamily Lamiinae.

- Paranaleptes giraffa (Kiresch, 1924)
- Paranaleptes reticulata (Thomson, 1877) - Cashew Stem Girdler
