= Paranaleptes giraffa =

Scientific classification
- Domain: Eukaryota
- Kingdom: Animalia
- Phylum: Arthropoda
- Class: Insecta
- Order: Coleoptera
- Suborder: Polyphaga
- Infraorder: Cucujiformia
- Family: Cerambycidae
- Genus: Paranaleptes
- Species: P. giraffa

Binomial name
- Paranaleptes giraffa (Kiresch, 1924)

Species of beetle

Paranaleptes giraffa is a species of beetle in the family Cerambycidae. It was described by Kiresch in 1924.
