= Gnathoenia albescens =

Scientific classification
- Kingdom: Animalia
- Phylum: Arthropoda
- Class: Insecta
- Order: Coleoptera
- Suborder: Polyphaga
- Infraorder: Cucujiformia
- Family: Cerambycidae
- Genus: Gnathoenia
- Species: G. albescens

Binomial name
- Gnathoenia albescens Breuning, 1939

Species of beetle

Gnathoenia albescens is a species of beetle in the family Cerambycidae. It was described by Stephan von Breuning in 1939. It is known from Gabon.
