= Gnathoenia flavovariegata =

Scientific classification
- Kingdom: Animalia
- Phylum: Arthropoda
- Class: Insecta
- Order: Coleoptera
- Suborder: Polyphaga
- Infraorder: Cucujiformia
- Family: Cerambycidae
- Genus: Gnathoenia
- Species: G. flavovariegata

Binomial name
- Gnathoenia flavovariegata Breuning, 1935

Species of beetle

Gnathoenia flavovariegata is a species of beetle in the family Cerambycidae. It was described by Stephan von Breuning in 1935. It is known from the Ivory Coast, Ghana, and Sierra Leone.
