= Gnathoenia tropica =

Scientific classification
- Kingdom: Animalia
- Phylum: Arthropoda
- Class: Insecta
- Order: Coleoptera
- Suborder: Polyphaga
- Infraorder: Cucujiformia
- Family: Cerambycidae
- Genus: Gnathoenia
- Species: G. tropica

Binomial name
- Gnathoenia tropica (Duvivier, 1891)

Synonyms
- Eumimetes tropicus Duvivier, 1891; Frea tropica (Duvivier) Aurivillius, 1910

Species of beetle

Gnathoenia tropica is a species of beetle in the family Cerambycidae. It was described by Duvivier in 1891. It is known from Cameroon, Equatorial Guinea, the Democratic Republic of the Congo, and Gabon. It contains the varietas Gnathoenia tropica var. irrorata.
