= Cochliopalpus boranus =

Scientific classification
- Domain: Eukaryota
- Kingdom: Animalia
- Phylum: Arthropoda
- Class: Insecta
- Order: Coleoptera
- Suborder: Polyphaga
- Infraorder: Cucujiformia
- Family: Cerambycidae
- Genus: Cochliopalpus
- Species: C. boranus

Binomial name
- Cochliopalpus boranus Müller, 1938

Species of beetle

Cochliopalpus boranus is a species of beetle in the family Cerambycidae. It was described by Müller in 1938.
