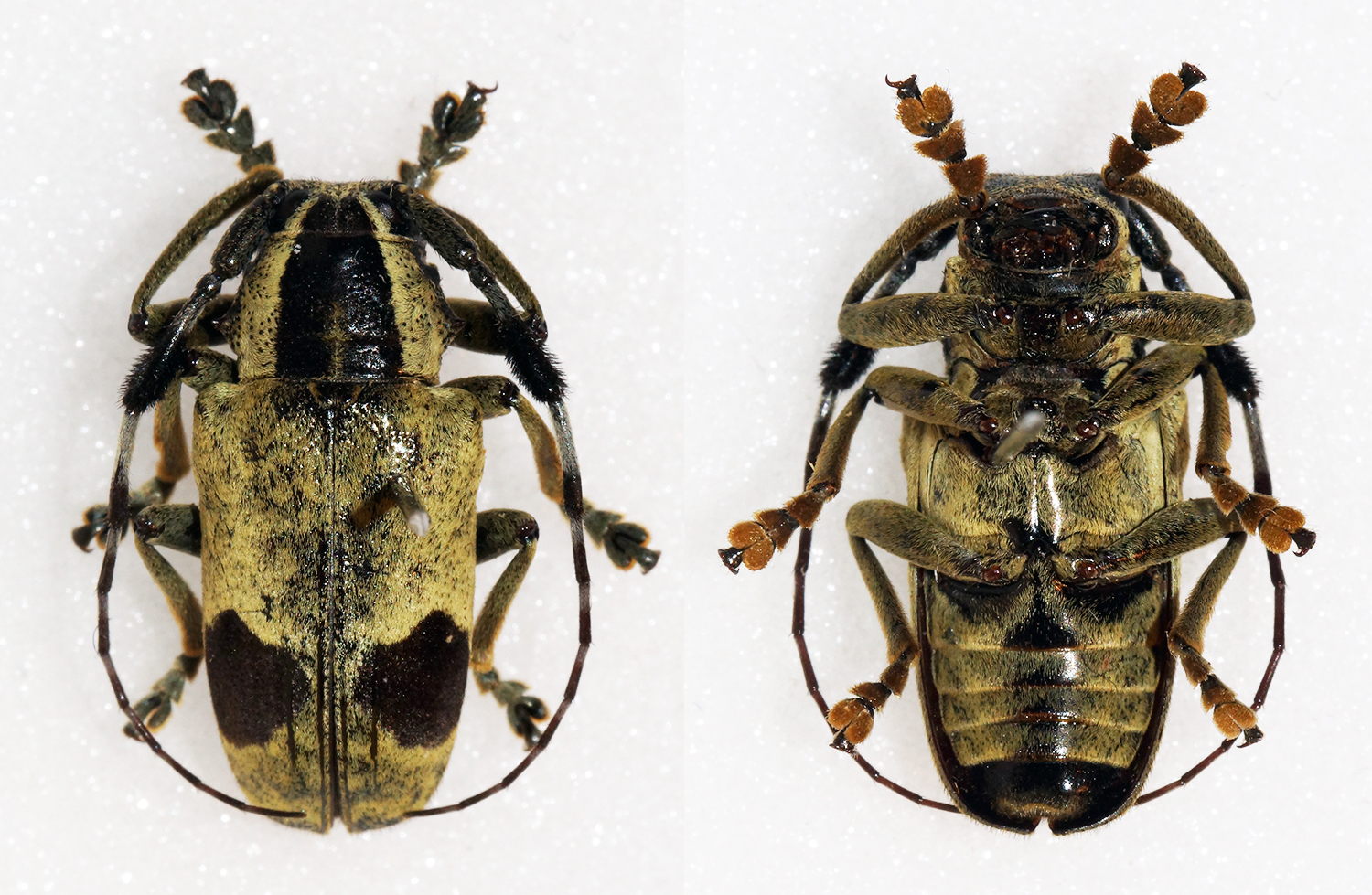
- Sex: Male

Scientific classification
- Domain: Eukaryota
- Kingdom: Animalia
- Phylum: Arthropoda
- Class: Insecta
- Order: Coleoptera
- Suborder: Polyphaga
- Infraorder: Cucujiformia
- Family: Cerambycidae
- Genus: Pterotragus
- Species: P. lugens

Binomial name
- Pterotragus lugens Chevrolat, 1856

= Pterotragus =

Genus of beetles

Pterotragus is a genus of beetles in the family Cerambycidae, containing a single species, Pterotragus lugens. It was described by Chevrolat in 1856.
