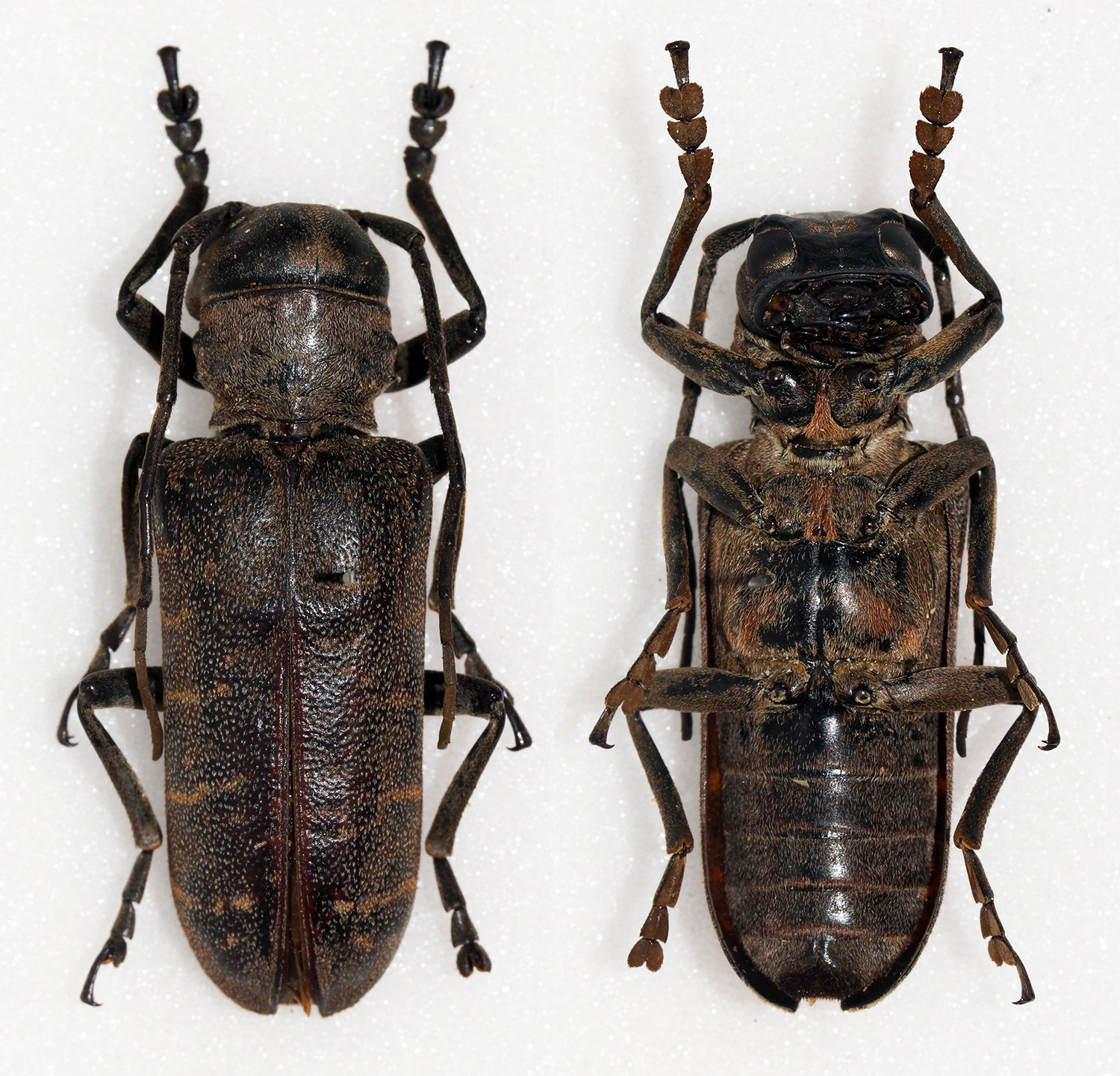
- Cochliopalpus catherina

Scientific classification
- Domain: Eukaryota
- Kingdom: Animalia
- Phylum: Arthropoda
- Class: Insecta
- Order: Coleoptera
- Suborder: Polyphaga
- Infraorder: Cucujiformia
- Family: Cerambycidae
- Subfamily: Lamiinae
- Genus: Cochliopalpus

Species
- Cochliopalpus boranus Müller, 1938; Cochliopalpus catherina (White, 1858); Cochliopalpus fimbriatus Aurivillius, 1928; Cochliopalpus suturalis Harold, 1880

= Cochliopalpus =

Genus of beetles

Cochliopalpus is a genus of longhorn beetles of the subfamily Lamiinae.

- Cochliopalpus boranus Müller, 1938
- Cochliopalpus catherina (White, 1858)
- Cochliopalpus fimbriatus Aurivillius, 1928
- Cochliopalpus suturalis Harold, 1880
