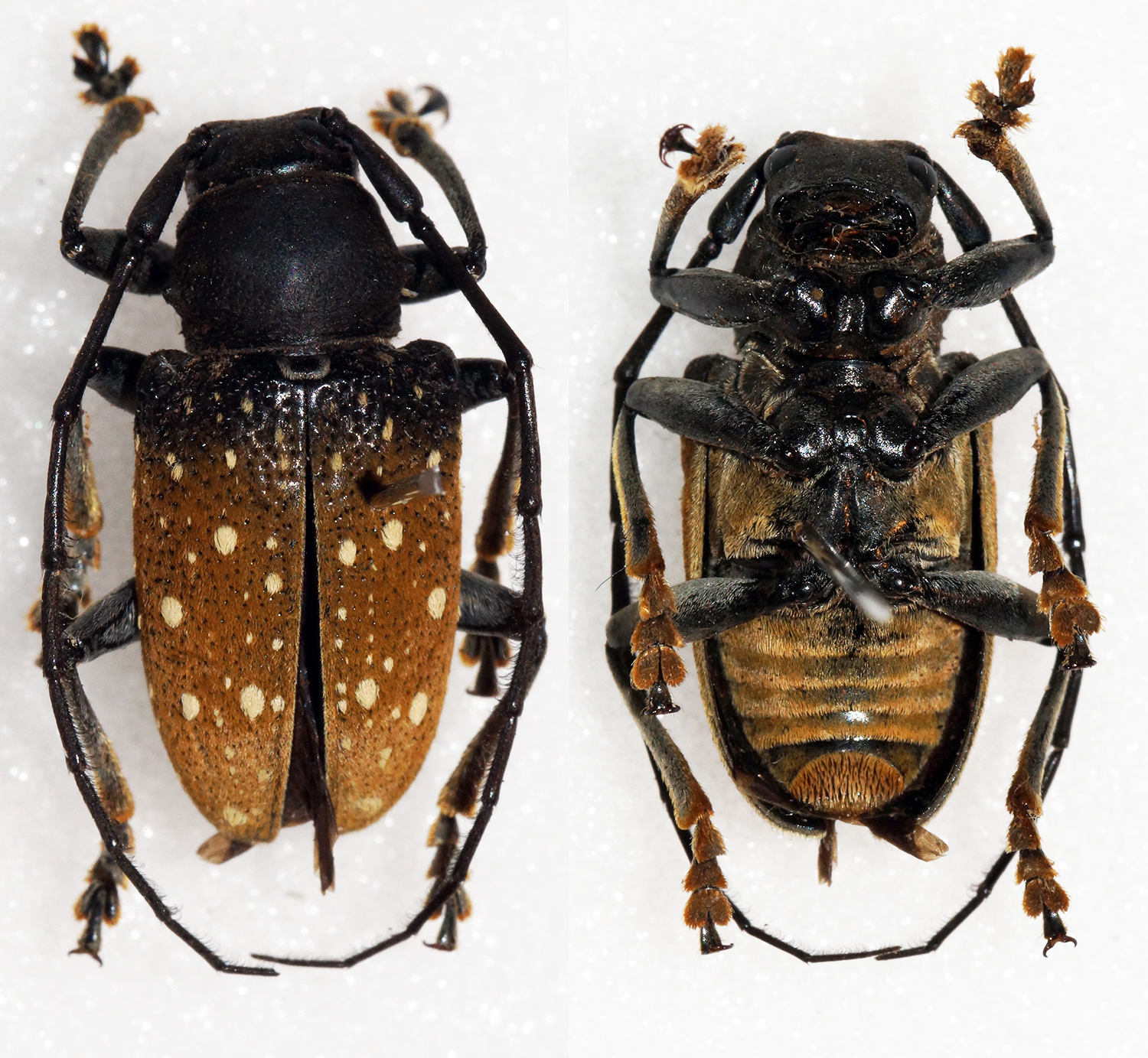
- Gnathoenia albomaculata

Scientific classification
- Missing taxonomy template (fix): Gnathoenia

= Gnathoenia =

Genus of beetles

Gnathoenia is a genus of longhorn beetles of the subfamily Lamiinae.

- Gnathoenia albescens Breuning, 1939
- Gnathoenia albomaculata Quedenfeldt, 1881
- Gnathoenia alboplagiata Jordan, 1894
- Gnathoenia bialbata Fairmaire, 1891
- Gnathoenia congoana Belon, 1901
- Gnathoenia flavovariegata Breuning, 1935
- Gnathoenia schoutedeni Breuning, 1935
- Gnathoenia tropica (Duvivier, 1891)
- Gnathoenia venerea Thomson, 1858
- Gnathoenia zonifera Harold, 1879
