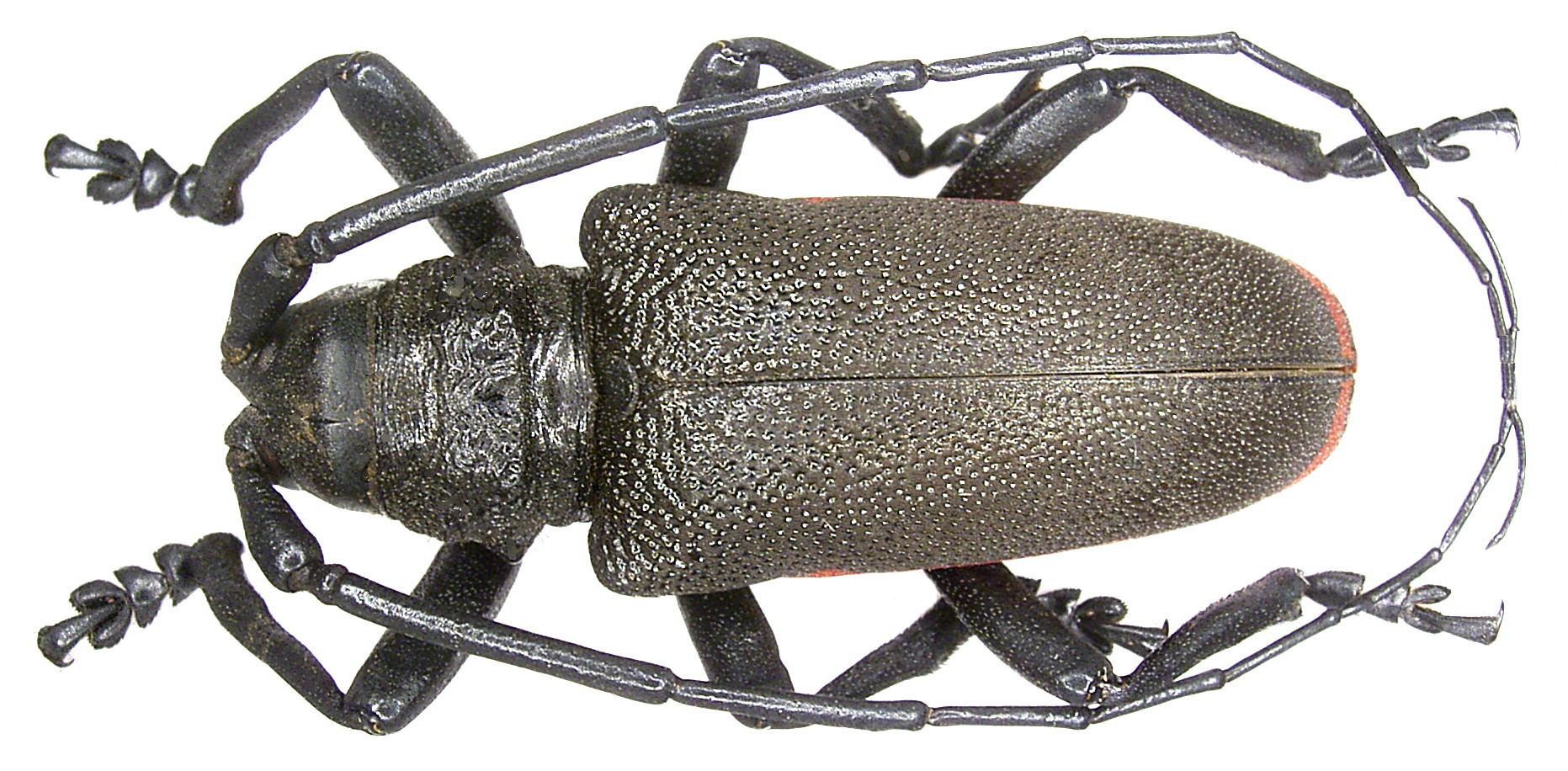
- Ceroplesis ferrugator

Scientific classification
- Domain: Eukaryota
- Kingdom: Animalia
- Phylum: Arthropoda
- Class: Insecta
- Order: Coleoptera
- Suborder: Polyphaga
- Infraorder: Cucujiformia
- Family: Cerambycidae
- Subfamily: Lamiinae
- Tribe: Ceroplesini; Thomson, 1860

= Ceroplesini =

Tribe of beetles

Ceroplesini is a tribe of longhorn beetles of the subfamily Lamiinae. It was described by Thomson in 1860.

== Taxonomy ==
- Ceroplesis Audinet-Serville, 1835
- Cochliopalpus Lacordaire, 1872
- Diastocera Dejean, 1835
- Gnathoenia Thomson, 1858
- Mimoceroplesis Breuning, 1967
- Paranaleptes Breuning, 1937
- Pterotragus Chevrolat, 1856
- Pycnopsis Thomson, 1857
- Thysia J. Thomson, 1860
- Titoceres Audinet-Serville, 1835
