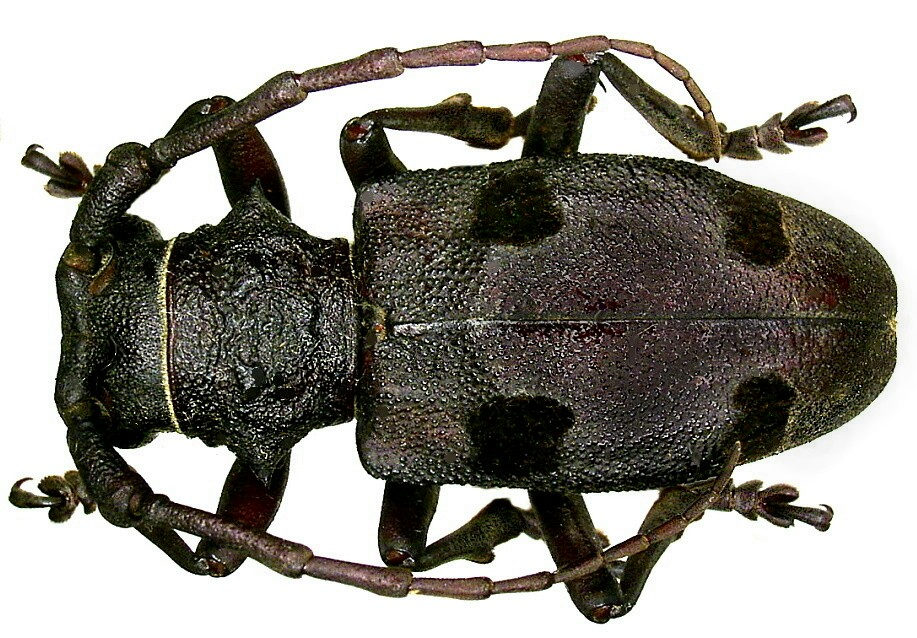
- Morimus funereus

Scientific classification
- Domain: Eukaryota
- Kingdom: Animalia
- Phylum: Arthropoda
- Class: Insecta
- Order: Coleoptera
- Suborder: Polyphaga
- Infraorder: Cucujiformia
- Family: Cerambycidae
- Subfamily: Lamiinae
- Tribe: Phrissomini; Thomson, 1860

= Phrissomini =

Tribe of beetles

Phrissomini is a tribe of longhorn beetles of the subfamily Lamiinae. It was described by Thomson in 1860.

== Taxonomy ==
- Brimidius Breuning, 1936
- Brimopsis Breuning, 1942
- Brimus Pascoe, 1862
- Echinovelleda Breuning, 1936
- Granulhepomidion Breuning, 1958
- Hayashiechthistatus Miyake, 1980
- Hepomidion Thomson, 1878
- Herophila Mulsant, 1863
- Macrospina Mateu, 1957
- Megalobrimus Aurivillius, 1916
- Mesechthistatus Breuning, 1950
- Mimechthistatus Breuning, 1956
- Morimospasma Ganglbauer, 1890
- Morimus Audinet-Serville, 1835
- Neophrissoma Breuning, 1938
- Neotrachystola Breuning, 1942
- Oriaethus Pascoe, 1864
- Parabrimidius Breuning, 1938
- Parabrimus Breuning, 1936
- Parahepomidion Breuning, 1936
- Paravelleda Breuning, 1936
- Parechthistatus Breuning, 1942
- Phrissoma Laporte de Castenau, 1840
- Phrissomorimus Breuning & Itzinger, 1943
- Pseudoechthistatus Pic, 1917
- Pseudostixis Breuning, 1936
- Pseudovelleda Breuning, 1936
- Setovelleda Breuning, 1961
- Spinospasma Breuning, 1970
- Spinovelleda Breuning, 1942
- Stixis Gahan, 1890
- Strandiata Breuning, 1936
- Trichostixis Breuning, 1936
- Velleda Thomson, 1858
- Velledopsis Breuning, 1936
