= Strandiata abyssinica =

Scientific classification
- Kingdom: Animalia
- Phylum: Arthropoda
- Class: Insecta
- Order: Coleoptera
- Suborder: Polyphaga
- Infraorder: Cucujiformia
- Family: Cerambycidae
- Genus: Strandiata
- Species: S. abyssinica

Binomial name
- Strandiata abyssinica (Breuning, 1935)

Synonyms
- Monochamus abyssinicus Breuning, 1935; Atrobiblis aethiopica (Müller, 1941); Granolamia aethiopica (Müller, 1941); Granulamia aethiopica (Müller, 1941) (misspelling); Tricholamia aethiopica Müller, 1941; Strandiata holonigra Breuning, 1974; Strandiata aethiopica (Müller, 1941); Strandiata breuningi Téocchi, Sudre & Jiroux, 2010 (unjustified replacement)

Species of beetle

Strandiata abyssinica is a species of beetle in the family Cerambycidae. It was described by Stephan von Breuning in 1935, originally under the genus Tricholamia. It is known from Ethiopia.
