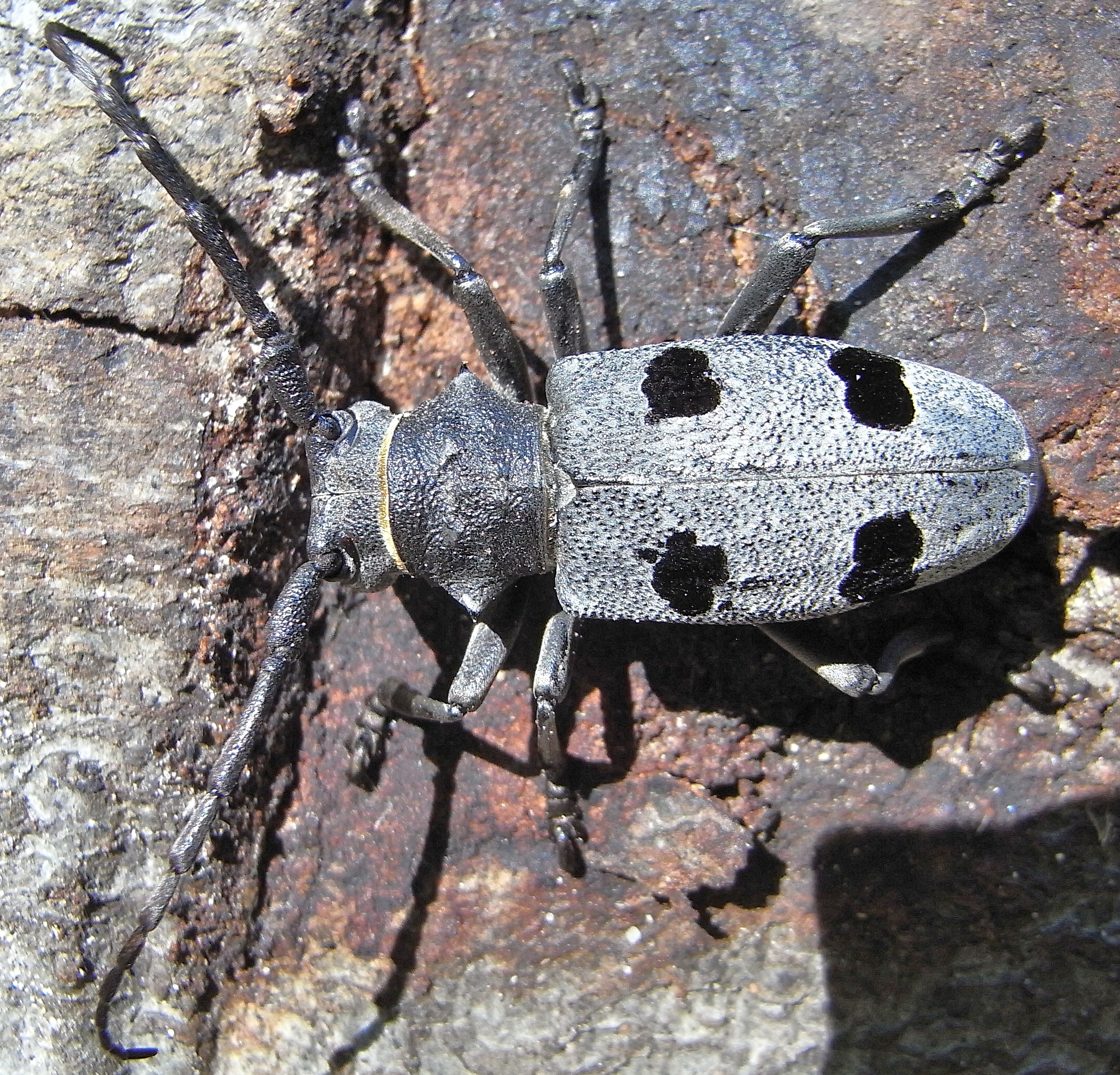

Conservation status
- Vulnerable (IUCN 2.3)

Scientific classification
- Kingdom: Animalia
- Phylum: Arthropoda
- Class: Insecta
- Order: Coleoptera
- Suborder: Polyphaga
- Infraorder: Cucujiformia
- Family: Cerambycidae
- Genus: Morimus
- Species: M. funereus

Binomial name
- Morimus funereus Mulsant, 1863

Synonyms
- Morimus asper funereus (Mulsant) Müller, 1949-1953; Morinus asper funereus (Mulsant) Sama, 1991; Morinus funereus (Mulsant) Tozlu, Rejzek & Özbek, 2003

= Morimus funereus =

Species of beetle

Morimus funereus is a species of beetle in family Cerambycidae. It is found in Greece, North Macedonia, Albania, Kosovo, Belgium, Croatia, Slovenia, the Czech Republic, Germany, Hungary, Italy, Moldova, Romania, Bulgaria, Serbia, Montenegro, Slovakia, Ukraine, Türkiye and Bosnia and Herzegovina. It is somewhat similar to another cerambycid, Rosalia alpina, which however is narrower and has three pairs of black spots. Also Herophila tristis has a similar body shape and markings, but the antennal segments 2 and beyond are much shorter.

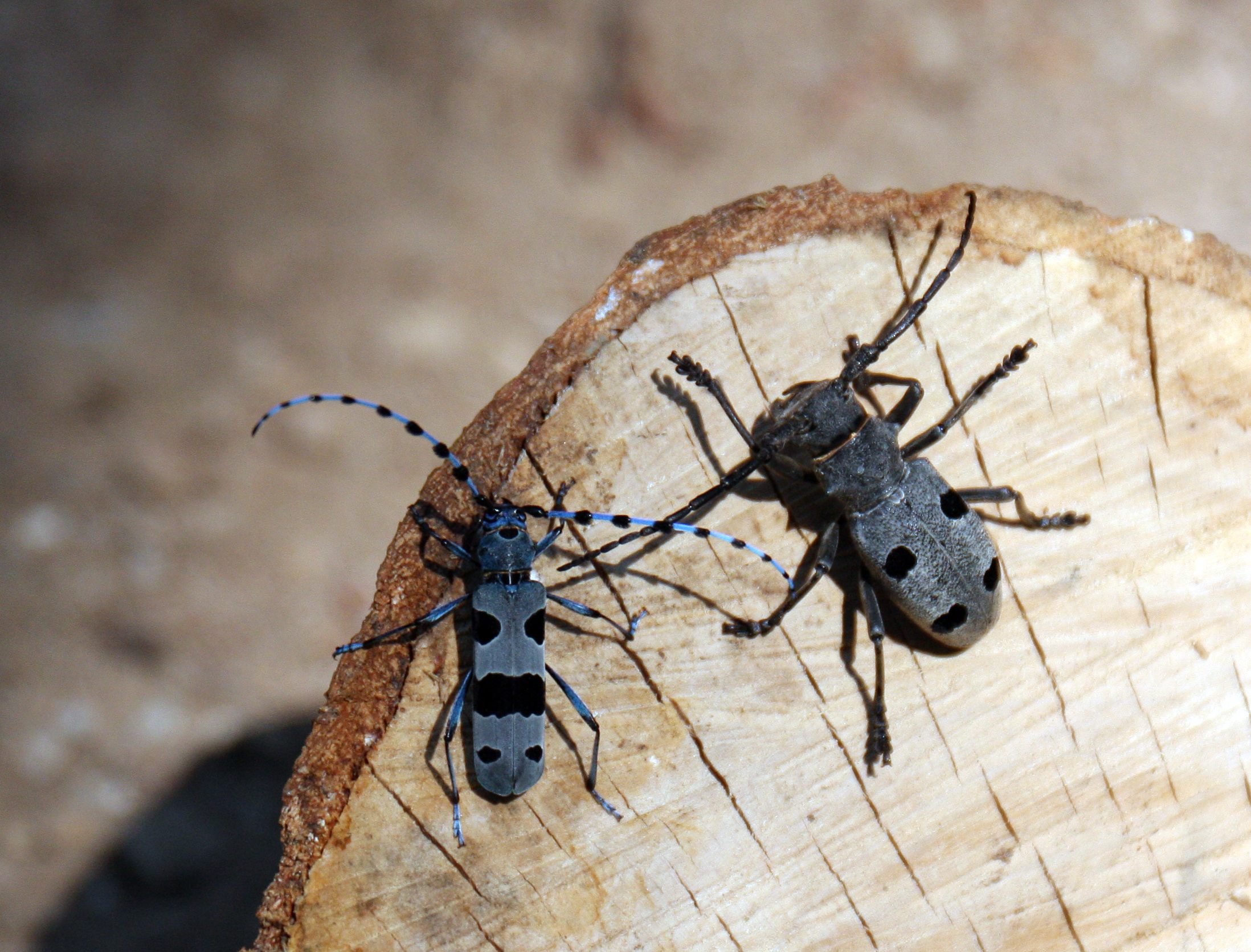
Side-by-side comparison of Morimus funereus (right) and Rosalia alpina (left)

Some suggest this taxon should be treated as a subspecies of Morimus asper, giving it the scientific name Morimus asper funereus.
