= Stixis =

Stixis is the scientific name of two genera of organisms and may refer to:

- Stixis (beetle), a genus of beetles in the family Cerambycidae
- Stixis (plant), a genus of plants in the family Resedaceae
