= Neophrissoma umbrinum =

Scientific classification
- Kingdom: Animalia
- Phylum: Arthropoda
- Class: Insecta
- Order: Coleoptera
- Suborder: Polyphaga
- Infraorder: Cucujiformia
- Family: Cerambycidae
- Genus: Neophrissoma
- Species: N. umbrinum

Binomial name
- Neophrissoma umbrinum (White, 1858)

Synonyms
- Phrissoma umbrinum White, 1858

Species of beetle

Neophrissoma umbrinum is a species of beetle in the family Cerambycidae. It was described by White in 1858, originally under the genus Phrissoma. It is known from South Africa.
