= Spinovelleda =

Scientific classification
- Kingdom: Animalia
- Phylum: Arthropoda
- Class: Insecta
- Order: Coleoptera
- Suborder: Polyphaga
- Infraorder: Cucujiformia
- Family: Cerambycidae
- Tribe: Phrissomini
- Genus: Spinovelleda

Genus of beetles

Spinovelleda is a genus of longhorn beetles of the subfamily Lamiinae, containing the following species:

- Spinovelleda basilewskyi Breuning, 1960
- Spinovelleda excavata Breuning, 1942
