= Morimospasma =

Scientific classification
- Kingdom: Animalia
- Phylum: Arthropoda
- Class: Insecta
- Order: Coleoptera
- Suborder: Polyphaga
- Infraorder: Cucujiformia
- Family: Cerambycidae
- Tribe: Phrissomini
- Genus: Morimospasma; Ganglbauer, 1889

Genus of beetles

Morimospasma is a genus of longhorn beetles of the subfamily Lamiinae, containing the following species:

- Morimospasma granulatum Chiang, 1981
- Morimospasma nitidituberculatum Hua, 1992
- Morimospasma paradoxum Ganglbauer, 1890
- Morimospasma tuberculatum Breuning, 1939
