= Parechthistatus =

Scientific classification
- Kingdom: Animalia
- Phylum: Arthropoda
- Class: Insecta
- Order: Coleoptera
- Suborder: Polyphaga
- Infraorder: Cucujiformia
- Family: Cerambycidae
- Tribe: Phrissomini
- Genus: Parechthistatus

Genus of beetles

Parechthistatus is a genus of longhorn beetles of the subfamily Lamiinae, containing the following species:

- Parechthistatus chinensis Breuning, 1942
- Parechthistatus furcifer (Bates, 1884)
- Parechthistatus gibber (Bates, 1873)
