= Parabrimus =

Scientific classification
- Kingdom: Animalia
- Phylum: Arthropoda
- Class: Insecta
- Order: Coleoptera
- Suborder: Polyphaga
- Infraorder: Cucujiformia
- Family: Cerambycidae
- Tribe: Phrissomini
- Genus: Parabrimus

Genus of beetles

Parabrimus is a genus of longhorn beetles of the subfamily Lamiinae, containing the following species:

- Parabrimus alboscutellatus Breuning, 1936
- Parabrimus bimaculatus Breuning, 1981
- Parabrimus ruficornis Breuning, 1981
