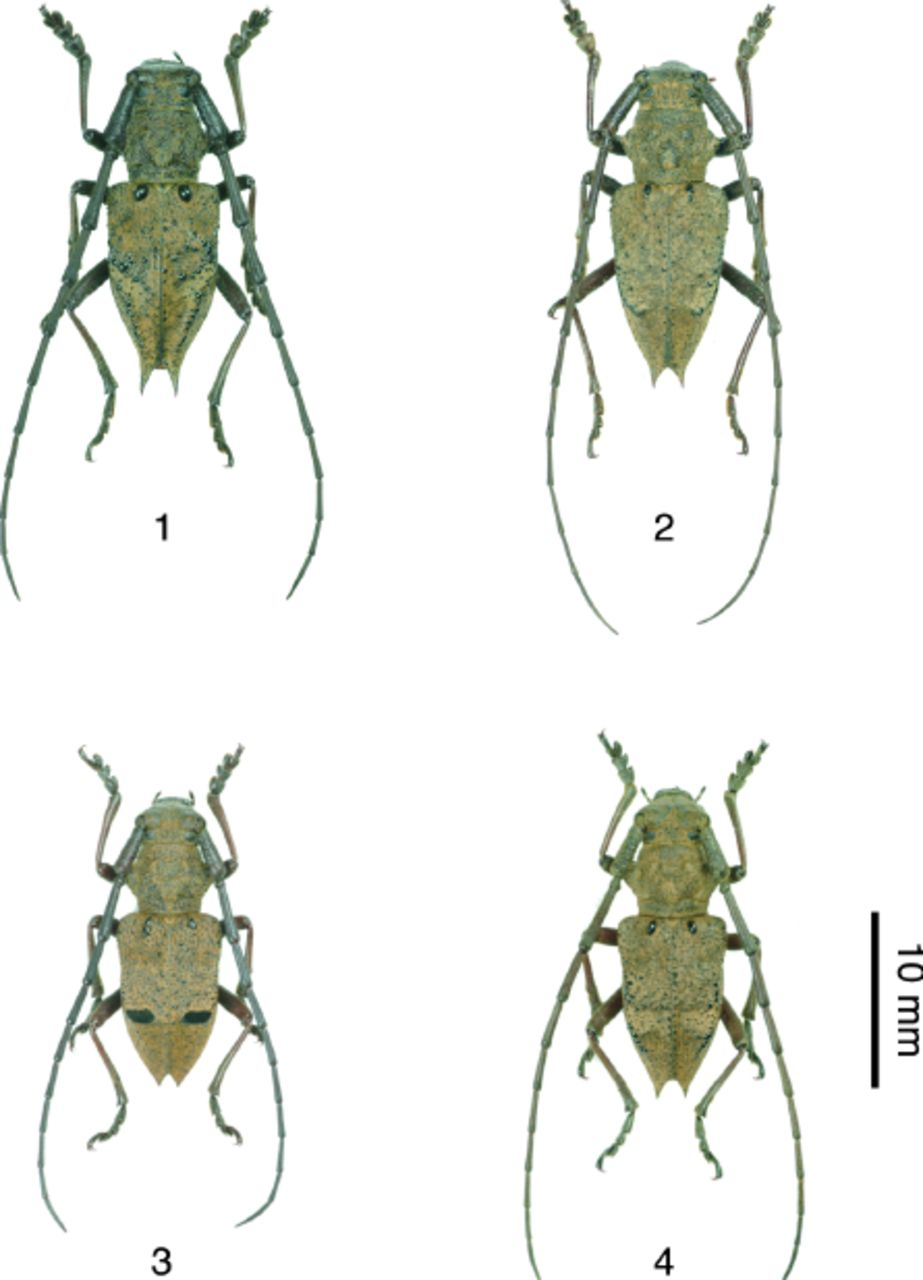
- 1. M. binodosus; 2. M. furciferus; 3. M. taniguchii; 4. M. fujisanus.

Scientific classification
- Kingdom: Animalia
- Phylum: Arthropoda
- Class: Insecta
- Order: Coleoptera
- Suborder: Polyphaga
- Infraorder: Cucujiformia
- Family: Cerambycidae
- Genus: Mesechthistatus
- Species: M. fujisanus

Binomial name
- Mesechthistatus fujisanus Hayashi, 1957

= Mesechthistatus fujisanus =

Species of beetle

Mesechthistatus fujisanus is a species of beetle in the family Cerambycidae. It is endemic to Japan and occurs in central Honshu.

Adults measure 12–19 mm (0.47–0.75 in) and are flightless.
