= Echinovelleda =

Scientific classification
- Kingdom: Animalia
- Phylum: Arthropoda
- Class: Insecta
- Order: Coleoptera
- Suborder: Polyphaga
- Infraorder: Cucujiformia
- Family: Cerambycidae
- Subfamily: Lamiinae
- Tribe: Phrissomini
- Genus: Echinovelleda; Breuning, 1936

Genus of beetles

Echinovelleda is a genus of longhorn beetles of the subfamily Lamiinae, containing the following species:

- Echinovelleda antiqua Gressitt, 1951
- Echinovelleda chinensis Breuning, 1936
