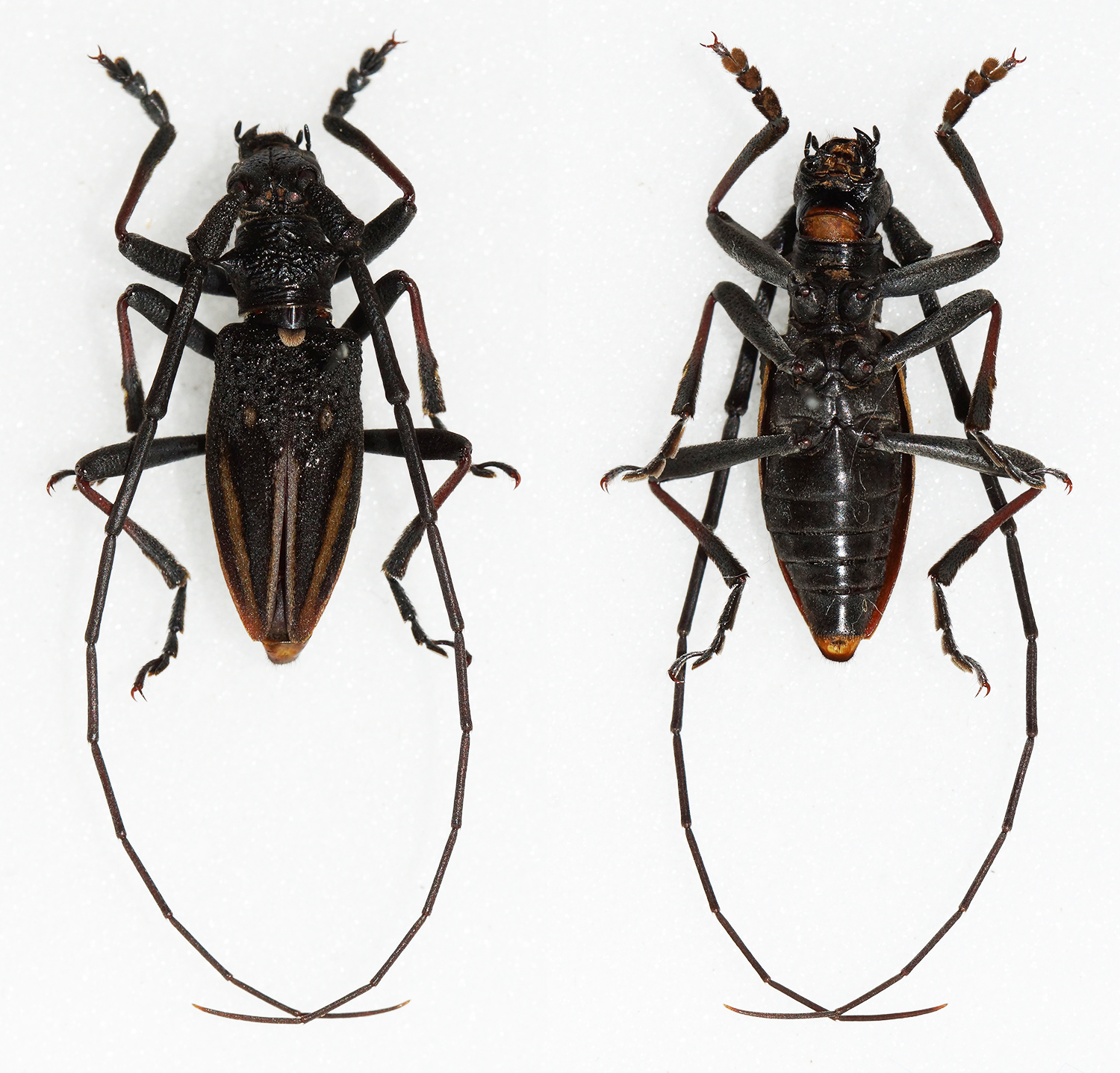

Scientific classification
- Kingdom: Animalia
- Phylum: Arthropoda
- Class: Insecta
- Order: Coleoptera
- Suborder: Polyphaga
- Infraorder: Cucujiformia
- Family: Cerambycidae
- Genus: Strandiata
- Species: S. renominata

Binomial name
- Strandiata renominata Vitali F. & Vitali C., 2012

Synonyms
- Strandiata abyssinica Breuning, 1936 nec Breuning, 1935

= Strandiata renominata =

Species of beetle

Strandiata renominata is a species of beetle in the family Cerambycidae, and the type species of its genus. It was described by Vitali F. and Vitali C. in 2012. It is known to be from Ethiopia.
