= Herophila fairmairei =

Scientific classification
- Domain: Eukaryota
- Kingdom: Animalia
- Phylum: Arthropoda
- Class: Insecta
- Order: Coleoptera
- Suborder: Polyphaga
- Infraorder: Cucujiformia
- Family: Cerambycidae
- Genus: Herophila
- Species: H. fairmairei

Binomial name
- Herophila fairmairei (Thomson, 1857)

Synonyms
- Dorcadion fairmairei Thomson, 1857; Dorcatypus fairmairei (Thomson, 1857); Herophila fairmairii (Thomson, 1857) (misspelling)

Species of beetle

Herophila fairmairei is a species of beetle in the family Cerambycidae. It was described by James Thomson in 1857 and is found in Greece. Herophila faurmairei live 2-3 years and are 12-25 mm in length.
