= Parahepomidion burgeoni =

Scientific classification
- Kingdom: Animalia
- Phylum: Arthropoda
- Class: Insecta
- Order: Coleoptera
- Suborder: Polyphaga
- Infraorder: Cucujiformia
- Family: Cerambycidae
- Genus: Parahepomidion
- Species: P. burgeoni

Binomial name
- Parahepomidion burgeoni Breuning, 1936

Synonyms
- Parabrimopsis grossepunctipennis Breuning, 1961; Pseudostixis denudatus Breuning, 1964

Species of beetle

Parahepomidion burgeoni is a species of beetle in the family Cerambycidae. It was described by Stephan von Breuning in 1936. It is found in the Democratic Republic of the Congo.
