= Neophrissoma =

Scientific classification
- Kingdom: Animalia
- Phylum: Arthropoda
- Class: Insecta
- Order: Coleoptera
- Suborder: Polyphaga
- Infraorder: Cucujiformia
- Family: Cerambycidae
- Tribe: Phrissomini
- Genus: Neophrissoma

Genus of beetles

Neophrissoma is a genus of longhorn beetles of the subfamily Lamiinae, containing the following species:

- Neophrissoma rotundipenne Breuning, 1938
- Neophrissoma umbrinum (White, 1858)
