= Stixis itzingeri =

Scientific classification
- Domain: Eukaryota
- Kingdom: Animalia
- Phylum: Arthropoda
- Class: Insecta
- Order: Coleoptera
- Suborder: Polyphaga
- Infraorder: Cucujiformia
- Family: Cerambycidae
- Genus: Stixis
- Species: S. itzingeri

Binomial name
- Stixis itzingeri Breuning, 1936

Species of beetle

Stixis itzingeri is a species of beetle in the family Cerambycidae. It was described by Stephan von Breuning in 1936.
