= Neophrissoma rotundipenne =

Scientific classification
- Kingdom: Animalia
- Phylum: Arthropoda
- Class: Insecta
- Order: Coleoptera
- Suborder: Polyphaga
- Infraorder: Cucujiformia
- Family: Cerambycidae
- Genus: Neophrissoma
- Species: N. rotundipenne

Binomial name
- Neophrissoma rotundipenne Breuning, 1938

Synonyms
- Neophrissoma rotundipennis Breuning, 1938 (misspelling)

Species of beetle

Neophrissoma rotundipenne is a species of beetle in the family Cerambycidae. It was described by Stephan von Breuning in 1938.
