= Pseudoechthistatus chiangshunani =

Scientific classification
- Kingdom: Animalia
- Phylum: Arthropoda
- Class: Insecta
- Order: Coleoptera
- Suborder: Polyphaga
- Infraorder: Cucujiformia
- Family: Cerambycidae
- Genus: Pseudoechthistatus
- Species: P. chiangshunani

Binomial name
- Pseudoechthistatus chiangshunani Bi & Lin, 2016

Species of beetle

Pseudoechthistatus chiangshunani is a species of beetle in the family Cerambycidae. It was described by Bi and Lin in 2016. It is known from China.
