= Parahepomidion =

Scientific classification
- Kingdom: Animalia
- Phylum: Arthropoda
- Class: Insecta
- Order: Coleoptera
- Suborder: Polyphaga
- Infraorder: Cucujiformia
- Family: Cerambycidae
- Tribe: Phrissomini
- Genus: Parahepomidion; Breuning, 1936

Genus of beetles

Parahepomidion is a genus of longhorn beetles of the subfamily Lamiinae, containing the following species:

- Parahepomidion burgeoni Breuning, 1936
- Parahepomidion fossulatum Breuning, 1936
- Parahepomidion granulatum (Aurivillius, 1908)
- Parahepomidion granulipenne Breuning, 1955
- Parahepomidion meruanum Breuning, 1958
- Parahepomidion nitidum (Aurivillius, 1916)
