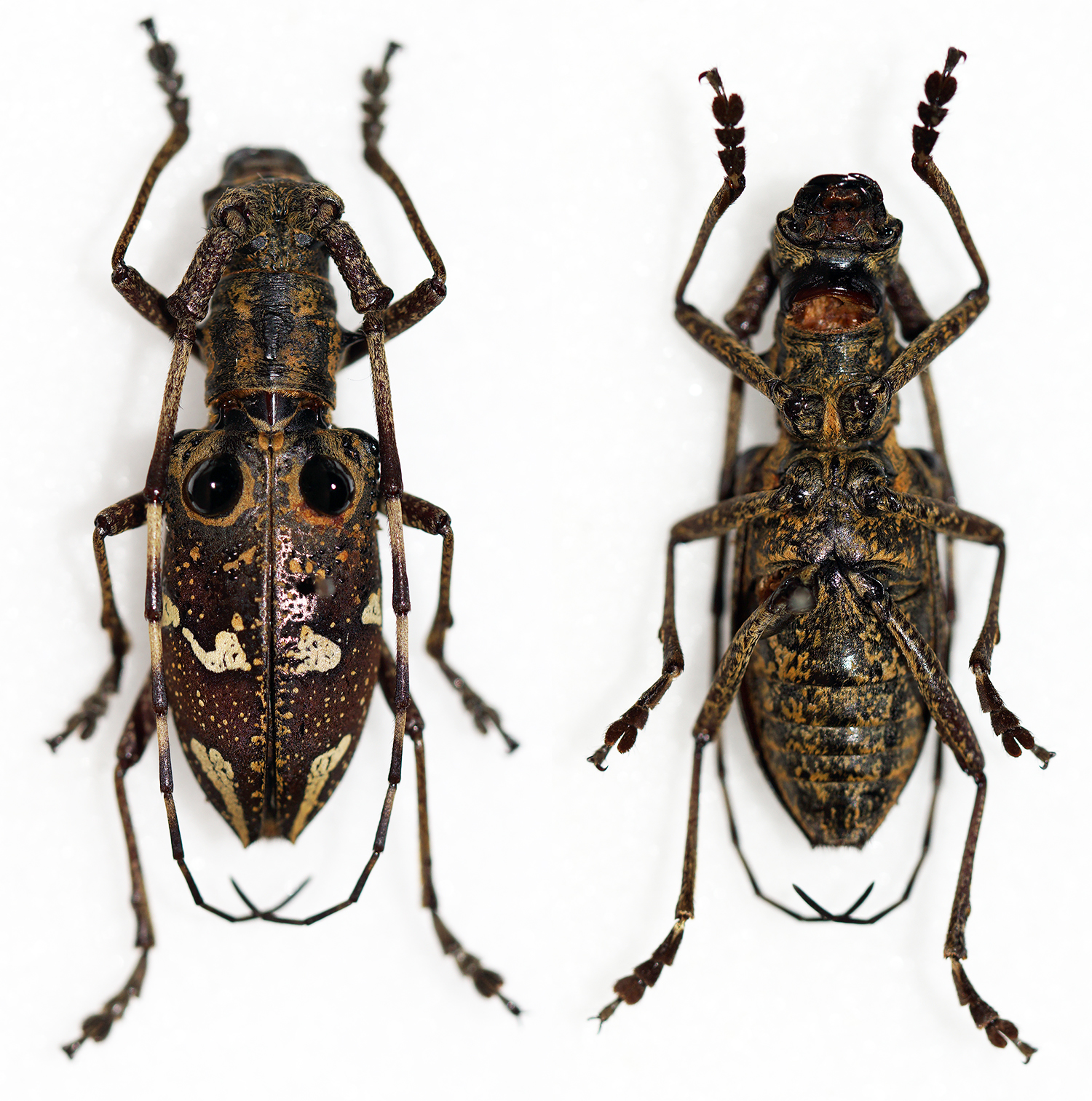

Scientific classification
- Kingdom: Animalia
- Phylum: Arthropoda
- Class: Insecta
- Order: Coleoptera
- Suborder: Polyphaga
- Infraorder: Cucujiformia
- Family: Cerambycidae
- Genus: Pseudoechthistatus
- Species: P. obliquefasciatus

Binomial name
- Pseudoechthistatus obliquefasciatus Pic, 1917

Synonyms
- Pseudechthistatus obliquefasciatus Pic, 1917 (misspelling)

= Pseudoechthistatus obliquefasciatus =

Species of beetle

Pseudoechthistatus obliquefasciatus is a species of beetle in the family Cerambycidae. It was described by Maurice Pic in 1917. It is known from China.
