= Morimospasma paradoxum =

Scientific classification
- Kingdom: Animalia
- Phylum: Arthropoda
- Class: Insecta
- Order: Coleoptera
- Suborder: Polyphaga
- Infraorder: Cucujiformia
- Family: Cerambycidae
- Genus: Morimospasma
- Species: M. paradoxum

Binomial name
- Morimospasma paradoxum Ganglbauer, 1890

Synonyms
- Trachystola difformis Pic, 1934

Species of beetle

Morimospasma paradoxum is a species of beetle in the family Cerambycidae. It was first described by the Austrian entomologist Ludwig Ganglbauer in 1890.

Although detailed studies on Morimospasma paradoxum are limited, it is believed to share the habits of most longhorn beetles, living on or around trees, where the larvae bore into wood while the adults feed on plant matter. This makes the species part of an important ecological cycle: helping break down dead or decaying wood and, in turn, enriching the soil.

The beetle is not one of the widely known species in its family, but it remains of interest to scientists who study biodiversity and forest health. By identifying and naming species like Morimospasma paradoxum, researchers such as Ganglbauer contributed to our understanding of insect diversity and the many roles beetles play in nature.
