= Megalobrimus densegranulatus =

Scientific classification
- Kingdom: Animalia
- Phylum: Arthropoda
- Class: Insecta
- Order: Coleoptera
- Suborder: Polyphaga
- Infraorder: Cucujiformia
- Family: Cerambycidae
- Genus: Megalobrimus
- Species: M. densegranulatus

Binomial name
- Megalobrimus densegranulatus Breuning, 1969

Species of beetle

Megalobrimus densegranulatus is a species of beetle in the family Cerambycidae. It was described by Stephan von Breuning in 1969. It is known from Cameroon.
