= Strandiata monikae =

Scientific classification
- Kingdom: Animalia
- Phylum: Arthropoda
- Class: Insecta
- Order: Coleoptera
- Suborder: Polyphaga
- Infraorder: Cucujiformia
- Family: Cerambycidae
- Genus: Strandiata
- Species: S. monikae

Binomial name
- Strandiata monikae Adlbauer, 2008

Species of beetle

Strandiata monikae is a species of beetle in the family Cerambycidae. It was described by Adlbauer in 2008. It is known from Ethiopia.
