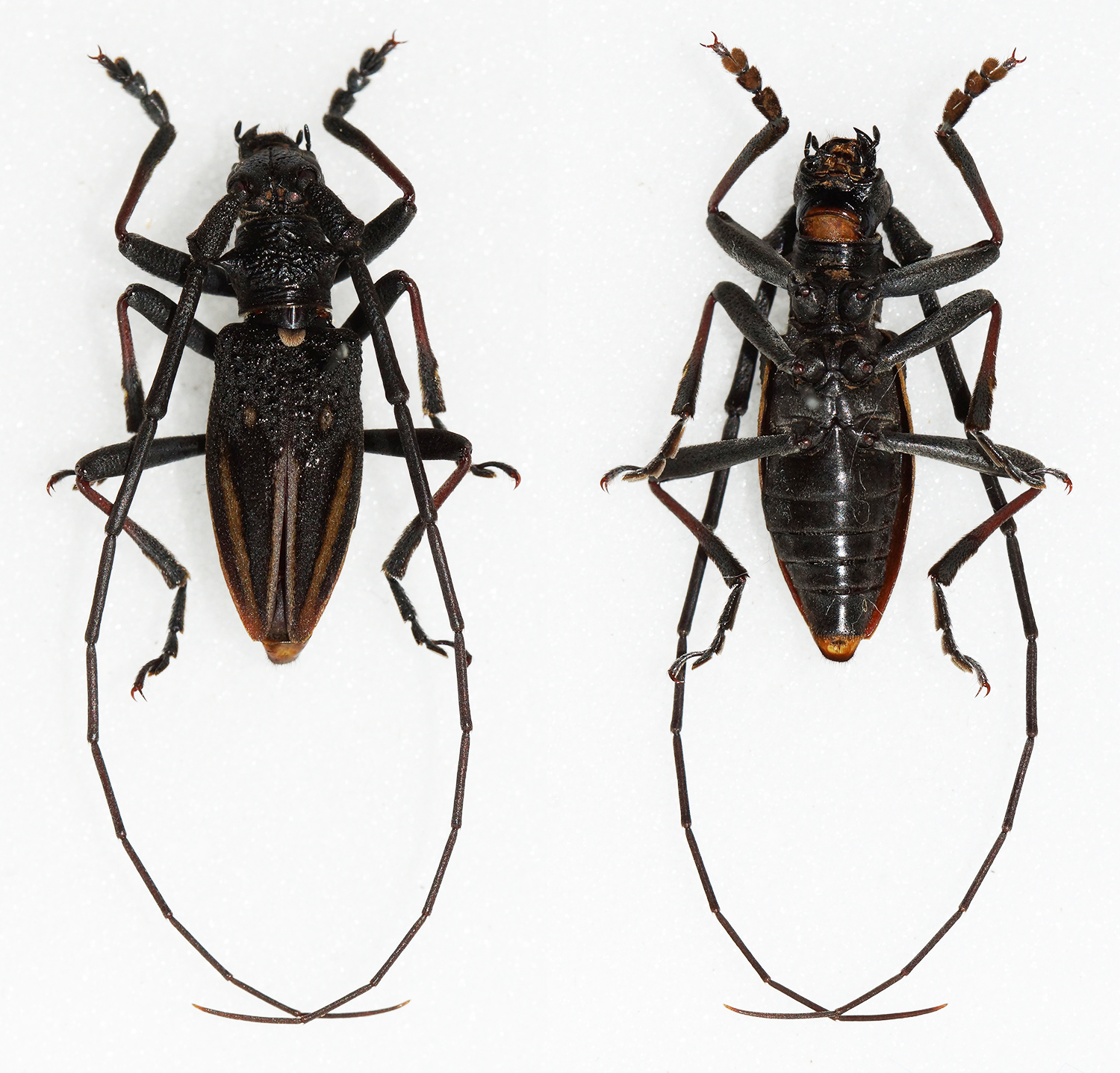

Scientific classification
- Kingdom: Animalia
- Phylum: Arthropoda
- Class: Insecta
- Order: Coleoptera
- Suborder: Polyphaga
- Infraorder: Cucujiformia
- Family: Cerambycidae
- Tribe: Phrissomini
- Genus: Strandiata

= Strandiata =

Genus of beetles

Strandiata is a genus of longhorn beetles of the subfamily Lamiinae, containing the following species:

- Strandiata abyssinica (Breuning, 1935)
- Strandiata lizleri Adlbauer, 2015
- Strandiata monikae Adlbauer, 2008
- Strandiata renominata Vitali F. & Vitali C., 2012
