= Parahepomidion nitidum =

Scientific classification
- Kingdom: Animalia
- Phylum: Arthropoda
- Class: Insecta
- Order: Coleoptera
- Suborder: Polyphaga
- Infraorder: Cucujiformia
- Family: Cerambycidae
- Genus: Parahepomidion
- Species: P. nitidum

Binomial name
- Parahepomidion nitidum (Aurivillius, 1916)

Species of beetle

Parahepomidion nitidum is a species of beetle in the family Cerambycidae. It was described by Per Olof Christopher Aurivillius in 1916.
