= Morimus orientalis =

Scientific classification
- Kingdom: Animalia
- Phylum: Arthropoda
- Class: Insecta
- Order: Coleoptera
- Suborder: Polyphaga
- Infraorder: Cucujiformia
- Family: Cerambycidae
- Genus: Morimus
- Species: M. orientalis

Binomial name
- Morimus orientalis Reitter, 1894

Synonyms
- Morinus orientalis Reitter, 1894

Species of beetle

Morimus orientalis is a species of beetle in the family Cerambycidae. It was described by Reitter in 1894. It is known from Turkey, Bulgaria, and Iran.
