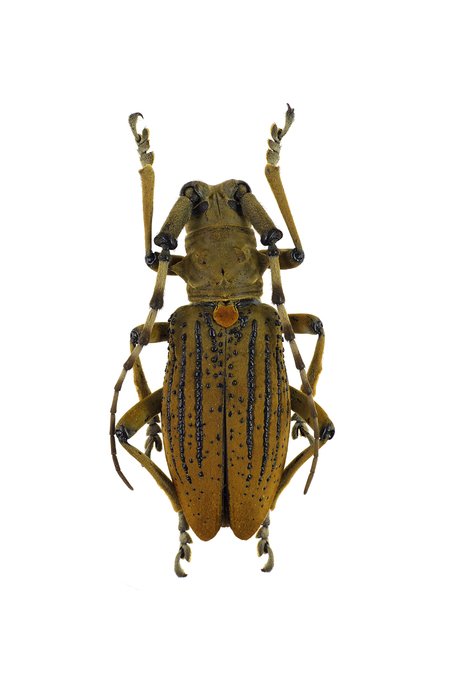
- Megalobrimus scutellatus

Scientific classification
- Kingdom: Animalia
- Phylum: Arthropoda
- Clade: Pancrustacea
- Class: Insecta
- Order: Coleoptera
- Suborder: Polyphaga
- Infraorder: Cucujiformia
- Family: Cerambycidae
- Subfamily: Lamiinae
- Tribe: Phrissomini
- Genus: Megalobrimus; Aurivillius, 1917

= Megalobrimus =

Genus of beetles

Megalobrimus is a genus of longhorn beetles of the subfamily Lamiinae, containing the following species:

- Megalobrimus annulicornis Breuning, 1959
- Megalobrimus densegranulatus Breuning, 1969
- Megalobrimus granulipennis Breuning, 1954
- Megalobrimus ingranulatus Breuning, 1936
- Megalobrimus lettowvorbecki Kriesche, 1923
- Megalobrimus parvus Breuning, 1969
- Megalobrimus scutellatus Aurivillius, 1916
