= Brimidius =

Scientific classification
- Kingdom: Animalia
- Phylum: Arthropoda
- Class: Insecta
- Order: Coleoptera
- Suborder: Polyphaga
- Infraorder: Cucujiformia
- Family: Cerambycidae
- Tribe: Phrissomini
- Genus: Brimidius

Genus of beetles

Brimidius is a genus of longhorn beetles of the subfamily Lamiinae, containing the following species:

- Brimidius annulicornis Breuning, 1954
- Brimidius granulipennis Breuning, 1955
- Brimidius laevicollis (Aurivillius, 1908)
