= Velledopsis =

Scientific classification
- Kingdom: Animalia
- Phylum: Arthropoda
- Class: Insecta
- Order: Coleoptera
- Suborder: Polyphaga
- Infraorder: Cucujiformia
- Family: Cerambycidae
- Tribe: Phrissomini
- Genus: Velledopsis

Genus of beetles

Velledopsis is a genus of longhorn beetles of the subfamily Lamiinae, containing the following species:

- Velledopsis kenyensis Breuning, 1936
- Velledopsis tanganycae Breuning, 1969
