= Brimidius annulicornis =

Scientific classification
- Kingdom: Animalia
- Phylum: Arthropoda
- Class: Insecta
- Order: Coleoptera
- Suborder: Polyphaga
- Infraorder: Cucujiformia
- Family: Cerambycidae
- Genus: Brimidius
- Species: B. annulicornis

Binomial name
- Brimidius annulicornis Breuning, 1954

Synonyms
- Brimidius granulipennis Breuning, 1955

Species of beetle

Brimidius annulicornis is a species of beetle in the family Cerambycidae. It was described by Stephan von Breuning in 1954. It is known from Tanzania and Rwanda.
