= Brimidius laevicollis =

Scientific classification
- Kingdom: Animalia
- Phylum: Arthropoda
- Class: Insecta
- Order: Coleoptera
- Suborder: Polyphaga
- Infraorder: Cucujiformia
- Family: Cerambycidae
- Genus: Brimidius
- Species: B. laevicollis

Binomial name
- Brimidius laevicollis (Aurivillius, 1908)

Synonyms
- Stixis laevicollis Aurivillius, 1908

Species of beetle

Brimidius laevicollis is a species of beetle in the family Cerambycidae. It was described by Per Olof Christopher Aurivillius in 1908. It is known from Tanzania.
