= Echinovelleda antiqua =

Scientific classification
- Domain: Eukaryota
- Kingdom: Animalia
- Phylum: Arthropoda
- Class: Insecta
- Order: Coleoptera
- Suborder: Polyphaga
- Infraorder: Cucujiformia
- Family: Cerambycidae
- Genus: Echinovelleda
- Species: E. antiqua

Binomial name
- Echinovelleda antiqua Gressitt, 1951

Species of beetle

Echinovelleda antiqua is a species of beetle in the family Cerambycidae. It was described by Gressitt in 1951. It is known from China.
