= Morimus plagiatus =

Scientific classification
- Domain: Eukaryota
- Kingdom: Animalia
- Phylum: Arthropoda
- Class: Insecta
- Order: Coleoptera
- Suborder: Polyphaga
- Infraorder: Cucujiformia
- Family: Cerambycidae
- Genus: Morimus
- Species: M. plagiatus

Binomial name
- Morimus plagiatus Waterhouse, 1881

Species of beetle

Morimus plagiatus is a species of beetle in the family Cerambycidae. It was described by Waterhouse in 1881. It is known from India.
