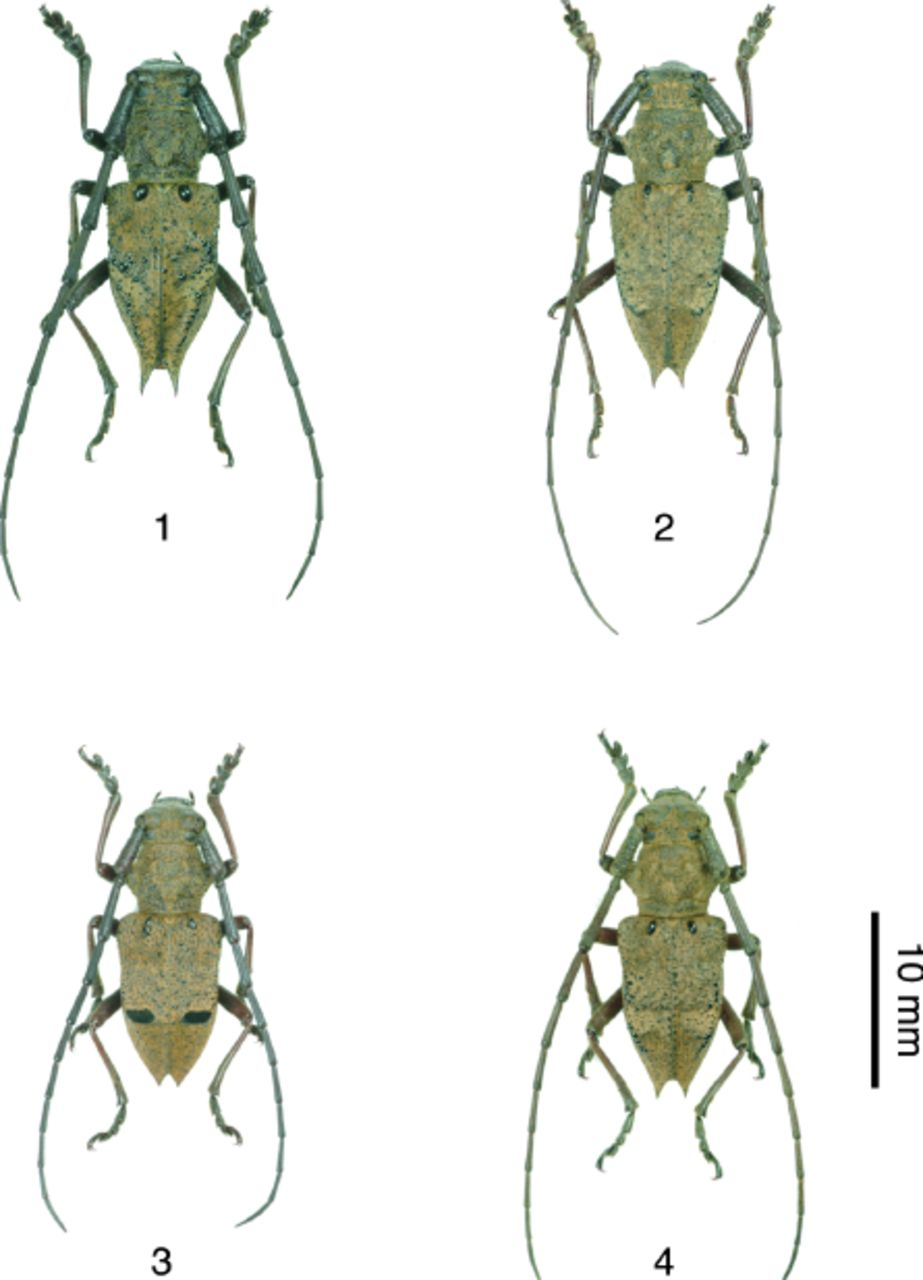
- 1. M. binodosus; 2. M. furciferus; 3. M. taniguchii; 4. M. fujisanus.

Scientific classification
- Kingdom: Animalia
- Phylum: Arthropoda
- Class: Insecta
- Order: Coleoptera
- Suborder: Polyphaga
- Infraorder: Cucujiformia
- Family: Cerambycidae
- Genus: Mesechthistatus
- Species: M. furciferus

Binomial name
- Mesechthistatus furciferus (Bates, 1884)

Synonyms
- Echthistatus furciferus Bates, 1884; Echthistatus furcifer Bates, 1884; Parechthistatus furcifer (Bates, 1884); Echthistatus binodosus meridionalis Hayashi, 1951; Mesechthistatus binodosus meridianus; Mesechthistatus binodosus meridionalis (Hayashi, 1951)

= Mesechthistatus furciferus =

Species of beetle

Mesechthistatus furciferus is a species of beetle in the family Cerambycidae. It was described by Henry Walter Bates in 1884. It is endemic to Japan and occurs in central Honshu.

Adults measure 13–23 mm (0.51–0.91 in) and are flightless.

== Subspecies ==
Two subspecies are recognized:

- Mesechthistatus furciferus furciferus (Bates, 1884)
- Mesechthistatus furciferus meridionalis (Hayashi, 1951)
