= Brimus randalli =

Scientific classification
- Domain: Eukaryota
- Kingdom: Animalia
- Phylum: Arthropoda
- Class: Insecta
- Order: Coleoptera
- Suborder: Polyphaga
- Infraorder: Cucujiformia
- Family: Cerambycidae
- Genus: Brimus
- Species: B. randalli

Binomial name
- Brimus randalli Distant, 1898

Species of beetle

Brimus randalli is a species of beetle in the family Cerambycidae. It was described by William Lucas Distant in 1898. It is known from the South African Republic.
