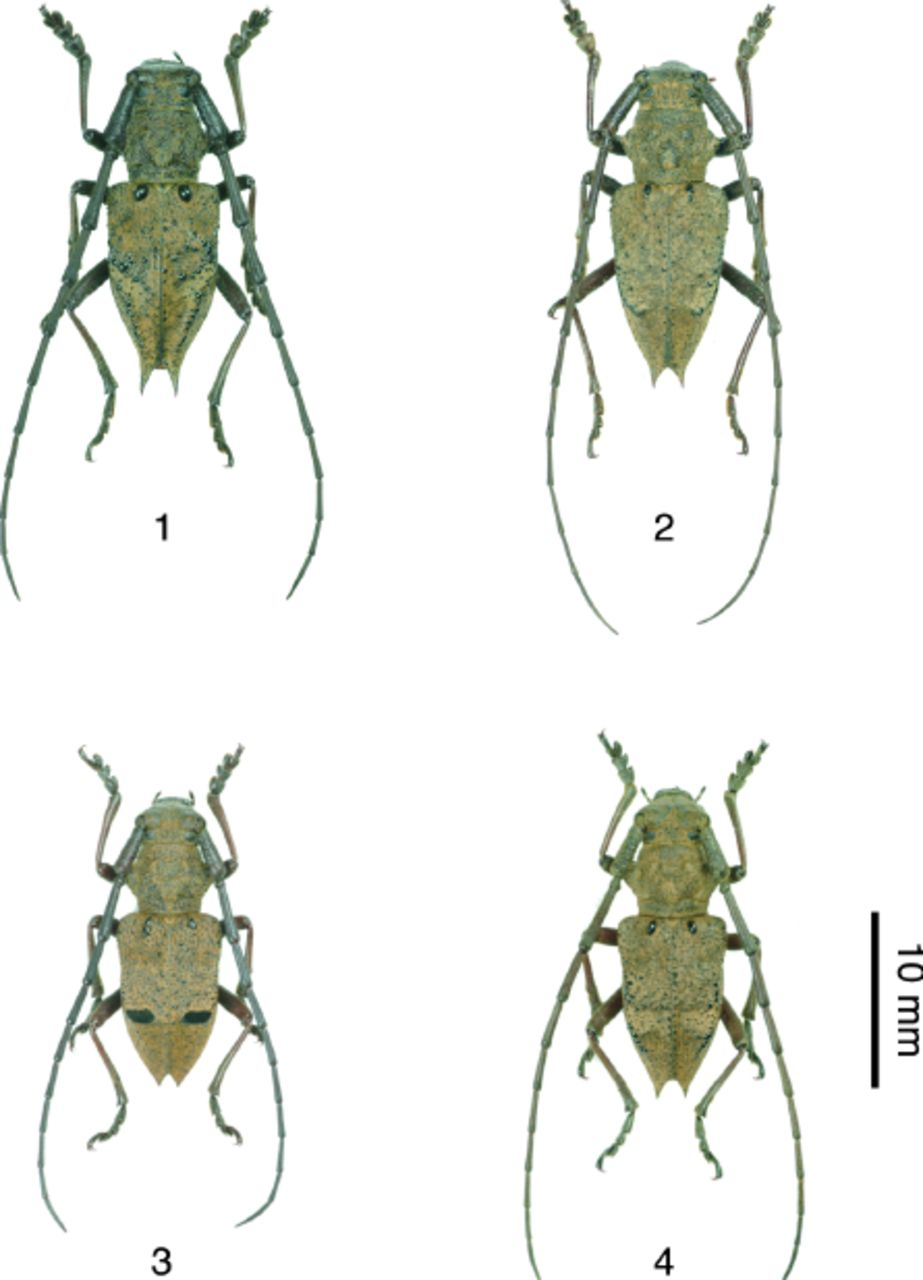
- 1. M. binodosus; 2. M. furciferus; 3. M. taniguchii; 4. M. fujisanus.

Scientific classification
- Kingdom: Animalia
- Phylum: Arthropoda
- Class: Insecta
- Order: Coleoptera
- Suborder: Polyphaga
- Infraorder: Cucujiformia
- Family: Cerambycidae
- Genus: Mesechthistatus
- Species: M. binodosus

Binomial name
- Mesechthistatus binodosus (Waterhouse, 1881)

Synonyms
- Echthistatus binodosus Waterhouse, 1881

= Mesechthistatus binodosus =

Species of beetle

Mesechthistatus binodosus is a species of beetle in the family Cerambycidae. It is endemic to Japan and occurs in the central and northern Honshu and on Sado Island.

Adults measure 14–24 mm (0.55–0.94 in) and are flightless.

== Subspecies ==
Two subspecies are recognized:

- Mesechthistatus binodosus binodosus (Waterhouse, 1881)
- Mesechthistatus binodosus insularis Hayashi, 1955 – Sado Island
