= Phrissoma crispum =

Scientific classification
- Kingdom: Animalia
- Phylum: Arthropoda
- Class: Insecta
- Order: Coleoptera
- Suborder: Polyphaga
- Infraorder: Cucujiformia
- Family: Cerambycidae
- Genus: Phrissoma
- Species: P. crispum

Binomial name
- Phrissoma crispum (Fabricius, 1776)

Synonyms
- Lamia crispa Fabricius, 1776

Species of beetle

Phrissoma crispum is a species of beetle in the family Cerambycidae. It was described by Johan Christian Fabricius in 1776. It is known from South Africa.
