= Stixis usambarica =

Scientific classification
- Kingdom: Animalia
- Phylum: Arthropoda
- Class: Insecta
- Order: Coleoptera
- Suborder: Polyphaga
- Infraorder: Cucujiformia
- Family: Cerambycidae
- Genus: Stixis
- Species: S. usambarica

Binomial name
- Stixis usambarica Adlbauer, 2010

Species of beetle

Stixis usambarica is a species of beetle in the family Cerambycidae. It was described by Adlbauer in 2010. It is known from Tanzania.
