= Pseudoechthistatus acutipennis =

Scientific classification
- Kingdom: Animalia
- Phylum: Arthropoda
- Class: Insecta
- Order: Coleoptera
- Suborder: Polyphaga
- Infraorder: Cucujiformia
- Family: Cerambycidae
- Genus: Pseudoechthistatus
- Species: P. acutipennis

Binomial name
- Pseudoechthistatus acutipennis Chiang, 1981

Species of beetle

Pseudoechthistatus acutipennis is a species of beetle in the family Cerambycidae. It was described by Chiang in 1981.
