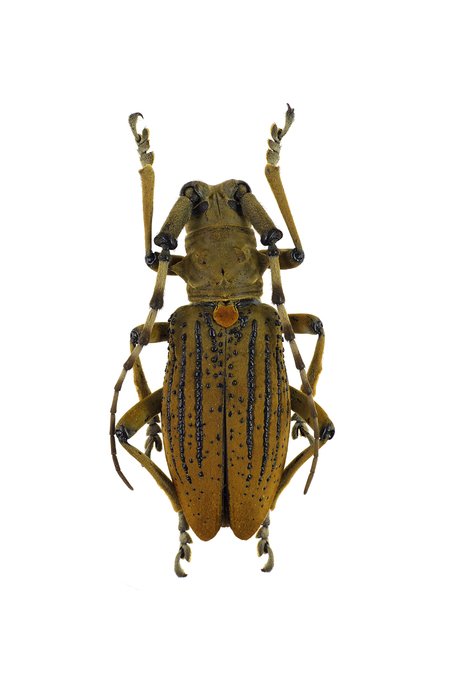

Scientific classification
- Kingdom: Animalia
- Phylum: Arthropoda
- Clade: Pancrustacea
- Class: Insecta
- Order: Coleoptera
- Suborder: Polyphaga
- Infraorder: Cucujiformia
- Family: Cerambycidae
- Genus: Megalobrimus
- Species: M. scutellatus

Binomial name
- Megalobrimus scutellatus Aurivillius, 1916

= Megalobrimus scutellatus =

Species of beetle

Megalobrimus scutellatus is a species of beetle in the family Cerambycidae. It was described by Per Olof Christopher Aurivillius in 1916. It is known from Tanzania and Malawi.
