= Velledopsis tanganycae =

Scientific classification
- Kingdom: Animalia
- Phylum: Arthropoda
- Class: Insecta
- Order: Coleoptera
- Suborder: Polyphaga
- Infraorder: Cucujiformia
- Family: Cerambycidae
- Genus: Velledopsis
- Species: V. tanganycae

Binomial name
- Velledopsis tanganycae Breuning, 1969

Species of beetle

Velledopsis tanganycae is a species of beetle in the family Cerambycidae. It was described by Stephan von Breuning in 1969. It is known from Tanzania.
