= Brimus spinipennis =

Scientific classification
- Domain: Eukaryota
- Kingdom: Animalia
- Phylum: Arthropoda
- Class: Insecta
- Order: Coleoptera
- Suborder: Polyphaga
- Infraorder: Cucujiformia
- Family: Cerambycidae
- Genus: Brimus
- Species: B. spinipennis

Binomial name
- Brimus spinipennis (Pascoe, 1858)

Synonyms
- Dorcadion spinipenne Pascoe, 1858

Species of beetle

Brimus spinipennis is a species of beetle in the family Cerambycidae. It was described by Francis Polkinghorne Pascoe in 1858. It is known from the South African Republic.
