= Tricholamia plagiata =

Scientific classification
- Kingdom: Animalia
- Phylum: Arthropoda
- Class: Insecta
- Order: Coleoptera
- Suborder: Polyphaga
- Infraorder: Cucujiformia
- Family: Cerambycidae
- Genus: Tricholamia
- Species: T. plagiata

Binomial name
- Tricholamia plagiata Bates, 1884

Species of beetle

Tricholamia plagiata is a species of beetle in the family Cerambycidae. It was described by Henry Walter Bates in 1884. It is known from the Democratic Republic of the Congo, Cameroon, Tanzania, and Ghana.
