= Parechthistatus furcifer =

Scientific classification
- Kingdom: Animalia
- Phylum: Arthropoda
- Class: Insecta
- Order: Coleoptera
- Suborder: Polyphaga
- Infraorder: Cucujiformia
- Family: Cerambycidae
- Genus: Parechthistatus
- Species: P. furcifer

Binomial name
- Parechthistatus furcifer (Bates, 1884)

Species of beetle

Parechthistatus furcifer is a species of beetle in the family Cerambycidae. It was described by Henry Walter Bates in 1884.
