= Tricholamia ruficornis =

Scientific classification
- Kingdom: Animalia
- Phylum: Arthropoda
- Class: Insecta
- Order: Coleoptera
- Suborder: Polyphaga
- Infraorder: Cucujiformia
- Family: Cerambycidae
- Genus: Tricholamia
- Species: T. ruficornis

Binomial name
- Tricholamia ruficornis (Hintz, 1911)

Synonyms
- Monohammus ruficornis (Hintz) Cools, 1993; Moechopsis ruficornis Hintz, 1911; Tricholamia plagiata (Bates) Breuning, 1944

Species of beetle

Tricholamia ruficornis is a species of beetle in the family Cerambycidae. It was described by Hintz in 1911, originally under the genus Moechopsis. It is known from Tanzania and the Democratic Republic of the Congo.
