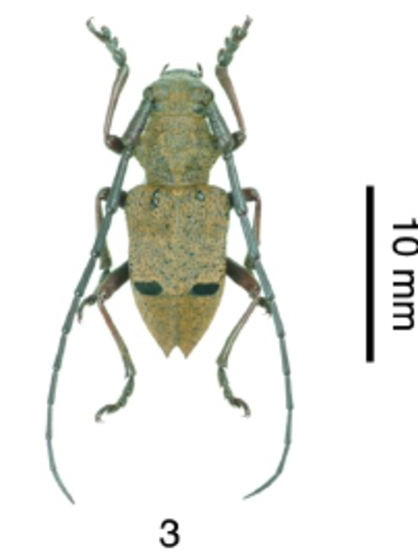

Scientific classification
- Kingdom: Animalia
- Phylum: Arthropoda
- Class: Insecta
- Order: Coleoptera
- Suborder: Polyphaga
- Infraorder: Cucujiformia
- Family: Cerambycidae
- Genus: Mesechthistatus
- Species: M. taniguchii

Binomial name
- Mesechthistatus taniguchii (Seki, 1944)

Synonyms
- Echthistatus taniguchii Seki, 1944; Mesechthistatus taniguchii hayashii Yokoyama, 1969

= Mesechthistatus taniguchii =

Species of beetle

Mesechthistatus taniguchii is a species of beetle in the family Cerambycidae. It is found in the central Honshu, Japan, and in Jiangxi, China.

Adults measure 14–18 mm (0.55–0.71 in) and are flightless.

== Subspecies ==
Two subspecies are sometimes recognized:

- Mesechthistatus taniguchii hayashii Yokoyama, 1969
- Mesechthistatus taniguchii taniguchii (Seki, 1944)
