= Megalobrimus granulipennis =

Scientific classification
- Kingdom: Animalia
- Phylum: Arthropoda
- Class: Insecta
- Order: Coleoptera
- Suborder: Polyphaga
- Infraorder: Cucujiformia
- Family: Cerambycidae
- Genus: Megalobrimus
- Species: M. granulipennis

Binomial name
- Megalobrimus granulipennis Breuning, 1954

Species of beetle

Megalobrimus granulipennis is a species of beetle in the family Cerambycidae. It was described by Stephan von Breuning in 1954. It is known from Tanzania.
