= Parechthistatus gibber =

Scientific classification
- Kingdom: Animalia
- Phylum: Arthropoda
- Class: Insecta
- Order: Coleoptera
- Suborder: Polyphaga
- Infraorder: Cucujiformia
- Family: Cerambycidae
- Genus: Parechthistatus
- Species: P. gibber

Binomial name
- Parechthistatus gibber (Bates, 1873)

Synonyms
- Echthistatus gibber Bates, 1873

Species of beetle

Parechthistatus gibber is a species of beetle in the family Cerambycidae. It was described by Henry Walter Bates in 1873, originally under the genus Echthistatus. It can be found in Japan and Korea.

== Subspecies ==
- Parechthistatus gibber daisen Miyake & Tsuji, 1980
- Parechthistatus gibber gibber (Bates, 1873)
- Parechthistatus gibber grossus (Bates, 1884)
- Parechthistatus gibber longicornis Hayashi, 1951
- Parechthistatus gibber nakanei Miyake, 1980
- Parechthistatus gibber nankiensis Yokoyama, 1980
- Parechthistatus gibber pseudogrossus Miyake, 1980
- Parechthistatus gibber shibatai Miyake, 1980
- Parechthistatus gibber tanakai Miyake, 1980
- Parechthistatus gibber tsushimanus Ohbayashi, 1961
