= Morimus granulipennis =

Scientific classification
- Kingdom: Animalia
- Phylum: Arthropoda
- Class: Insecta
- Order: Coleoptera
- Suborder: Polyphaga
- Infraorder: Cucujiformia
- Family: Cerambycidae
- Genus: Morimus
- Species: M. granulipennis

Binomial name
- Morimus granulipennis Breuning, 1939

Species of beetle

Morimus granulipennis is a species of beetle in the family Cerambycidae. It was described by Stephan von Breuning in 1939. It is known from Myanmar.

It's 14–15 mm long and 5.5–6.5 mm wide, and its type locality is Thandaung, Myanmar.
