= Stixis punctata =

Scientific classification
- Domain: Eukaryota
- Kingdom: Animalia
- Phylum: Arthropoda
- Class: Insecta
- Order: Coleoptera
- Suborder: Polyphaga
- Infraorder: Cucujiformia
- Family: Cerambycidae
- Genus: Stixis
- Species: S. punctata

Binomial name
- Stixis punctata Gahan, 1890

Species of beetle

Stixis punctata is a species of beetle in the family Cerambycidae. It was described by Charles Joseph Gahan in 1890. It is known from Tanzania and Kenya.
