= Phrissoma terricolum =

Scientific classification
- Kingdom: Animalia
- Phylum: Arthropoda
- Class: Insecta
- Order: Coleoptera
- Suborder: Polyphaga
- Infraorder: Cucujiformia
- Family: Cerambycidae
- Genus: Phrissoma
- Species: P. terricolum

Binomial name
- Phrissoma terricolum (Thomson, 1864)

Species of beetle

Phrissoma terricolum is a species of beetle in the family Cerambycidae. It was described by James Thomson in 1864. It is known from South Africa.
