= Echinovelleda chinensis =

Scientific classification
- Kingdom: Animalia
- Phylum: Arthropoda
- Class: Insecta
- Order: Coleoptera
- Suborder: Polyphaga
- Infraorder: Cucujiformia
- Family: Cerambycidae
- Genus: Echinovelleda
- Species: E. chinensis

Binomial name
- Echinovelleda chinensis Breuning, 1936

Species of beetle

Echinovelleda chinensis is a species of beetle in the family Cerambycidae. It was described by Stephan von Breuning in 1936. It is known from China.
