= Parahepomidion meruanum =

Scientific classification
- Kingdom: Animalia
- Phylum: Arthropoda
- Class: Insecta
- Order: Coleoptera
- Suborder: Polyphaga
- Infraorder: Cucujiformia
- Family: Cerambycidae
- Genus: Parahepomidion
- Species: P. meruanum

Binomial name
- Parahepomidion meruanum Breuning, 1958

Species of beetle

Parahepomidion meruanum is a species of beetle in the family Cerambycidae. It was described by Stephan von Breuning in 1958.
