= Brimus affinis =

Scientific classification
- Kingdom: Animalia
- Phylum: Arthropoda
- Class: Insecta
- Order: Coleoptera
- Suborder: Polyphaga
- Infraorder: Cucujiformia
- Family: Cerambycidae
- Genus: Brimus
- Species: B. affinis

Binomial name
- Brimus affinis Breuning, 1971

Species of beetle

Brimus affinis is a species of beetle in the family Cerambycidae. It was described by Stephan von Breuning in 1971. It is known from Mozambique.
