= Pseudoechthistatus granulatus =

Scientific classification
- Kingdom: Animalia
- Phylum: Arthropoda
- Class: Insecta
- Order: Coleoptera
- Suborder: Polyphaga
- Infraorder: Cucujiformia
- Family: Cerambycidae
- Genus: Pseudoechthistatus
- Species: P. granulatus

Binomial name
- Pseudoechthistatus granulatus Breuning, 1942

Synonyms
- Pseudechthistatus granulatus Breuning, 1942 (misspelling)

Species of beetle

Pseudoechthistatus granulatus is a species of beetle in the family Cerambycidae. It was described by Stephan von Breuning in 1942.
