= Morimus lethalis =

Scientific classification
- Domain: Eukaryota
- Kingdom: Animalia
- Phylum: Arthropoda
- Class: Insecta
- Order: Coleoptera
- Suborder: Polyphaga
- Infraorder: Cucujiformia
- Family: Cerambycidae
- Genus: Morimus
- Species: M. lethalis

Binomial name
- Morimus lethalis Thomson, 1857

Synonyms
- Leprodera morimoides White, 1858; Morimus morimoides (White, 1858); ?Trachystola 4-maculata var. trinotata Pic, 1925; ?Trachystola quadrimaculata Pic, 1925; Morimus whitei Lacordaire, 1869

Species of beetle

Morimus lethalis is a species of beetle in the family Cerambycidae. It was described by James Thomson in 1857. It is known from India, Vietnam, China, and Thailand.
