= Morimospasma nitidituberculatum =

Scientific classification
- Kingdom: Animalia
- Phylum: Arthropoda
- Class: Insecta
- Order: Coleoptera
- Suborder: Polyphaga
- Infraorder: Cucujiformia
- Family: Cerambycidae
- Genus: Morimospasma
- Species: M. nitidituberculatum

Binomial name
- Morimospasma nitidituberculatum Hua, 1992

Species of beetle

Morimospasma nitidituberculatum is a species of beetle in the family Cerambycidae. It was described by Hua in 1992.
