= Phrissoma reichei =

Scientific classification
- Kingdom: Animalia
- Phylum: Arthropoda
- Class: Insecta
- Order: Coleoptera
- Suborder: Polyphaga
- Infraorder: Cucujiformia
- Family: Cerambycidae
- Genus: Phrissoma
- Species: P. reichei

Binomial name
- Phrissoma reichei (Thomson, 1865)

Species of beetle

Phrissoma reichei is a species of beetle in the family Cerambycidae. It was described by James Thomson in 1865. It is known from South Africa.
