= Brimus =

Scientific classification
- Domain: Eukaryota
- Kingdom: Animalia
- Phylum: Arthropoda
- Class: Insecta
- Order: Coleoptera
- Suborder: Polyphaga
- Infraorder: Cucujiformia
- Family: Cerambycidae
- Tribe: Phrissomini
- Genus: Brimus; Pascoe, 1862

Genus of beetles

Brimus is a genus of longhorn beetles of the subfamily Lamiinae, containing the following species:

- Brimus affinis Breuning, 1971
- Brimus randalli Distant, 1898
- Brimus spinipennis (Pascoe, 1858)
