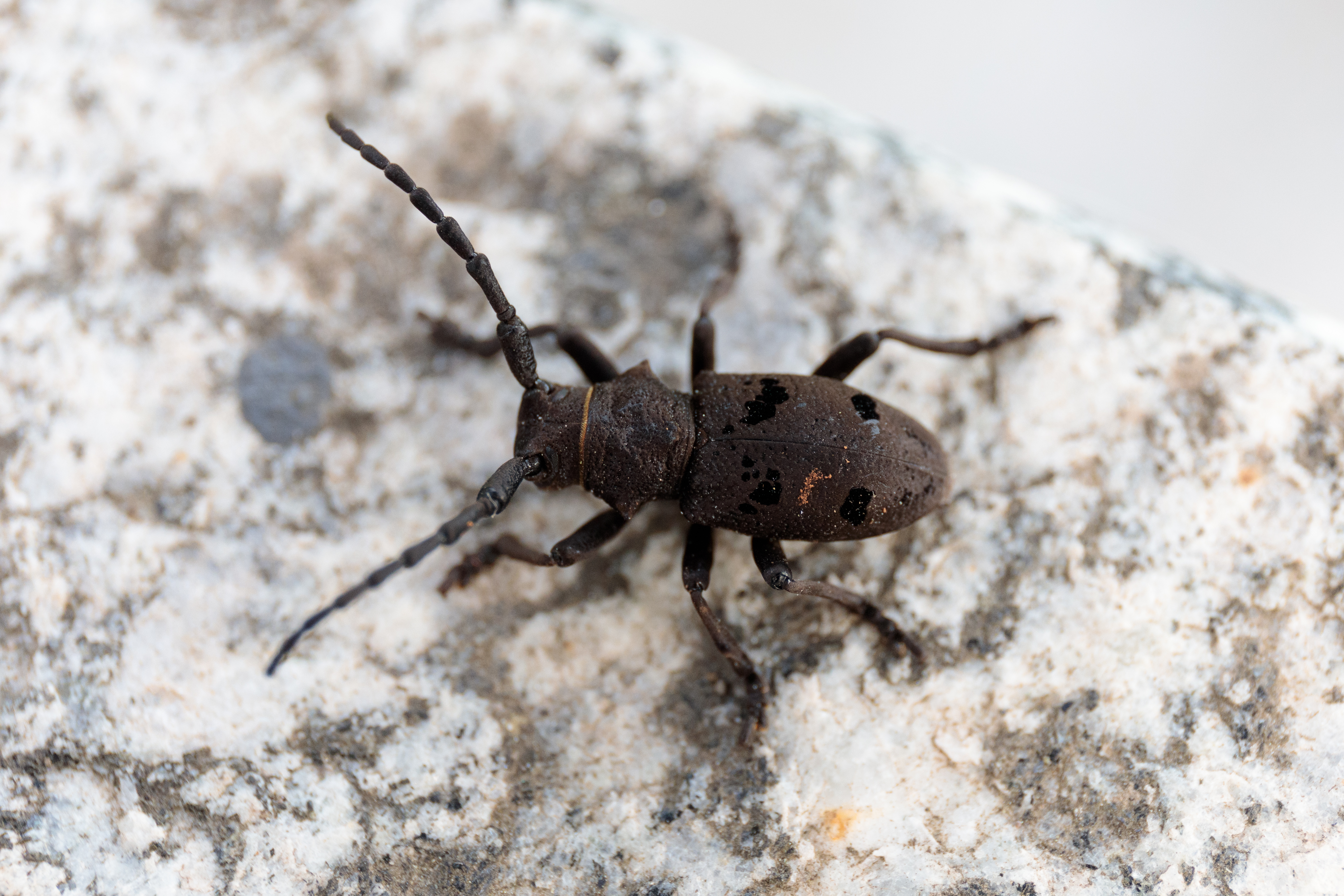
- Herophila tristis

Scientific classification
- Domain: Eukaryota
- Kingdom: Animalia
- Phylum: Arthropoda
- Class: Insecta
- Order: Coleoptera
- Suborder: Polyphaga
- Infraorder: Cucujiformia
- Family: Cerambycidae
- Subfamily: Lamiinae
- Tribe: Phrissomini
- Genus: Herophila; Mulsant, 1863

= Herophila =

Genus of beetles

Herophila is a genus of longhorn beetles of the subfamily Lamiinae, containing the following species:

- Herophila fairmairei (Thomson, 1857)
- Herophila tristis (Linnaeus, 1767)
