= Megalobrimus lettowvorbecki =

Scientific classification
- Kingdom: Animalia
- Phylum: Arthropoda
- Class: Insecta
- Order: Coleoptera
- Suborder: Polyphaga
- Infraorder: Cucujiformia
- Family: Cerambycidae
- Genus: Megalobrimus
- Species: M. lettowvorbecki

Binomial name
- Megalobrimus lettowvorbecki Kriesche, 1923

Synonyms
- Megalobrimus lettow-vorbecki Breuning, 1961

Species of beetle

Megalobrimus lettowvorbecki is a species of beetle in the family Cerambycidae. It was described by Richard Kriesche in 1923. It is known to be in Tanzania.
