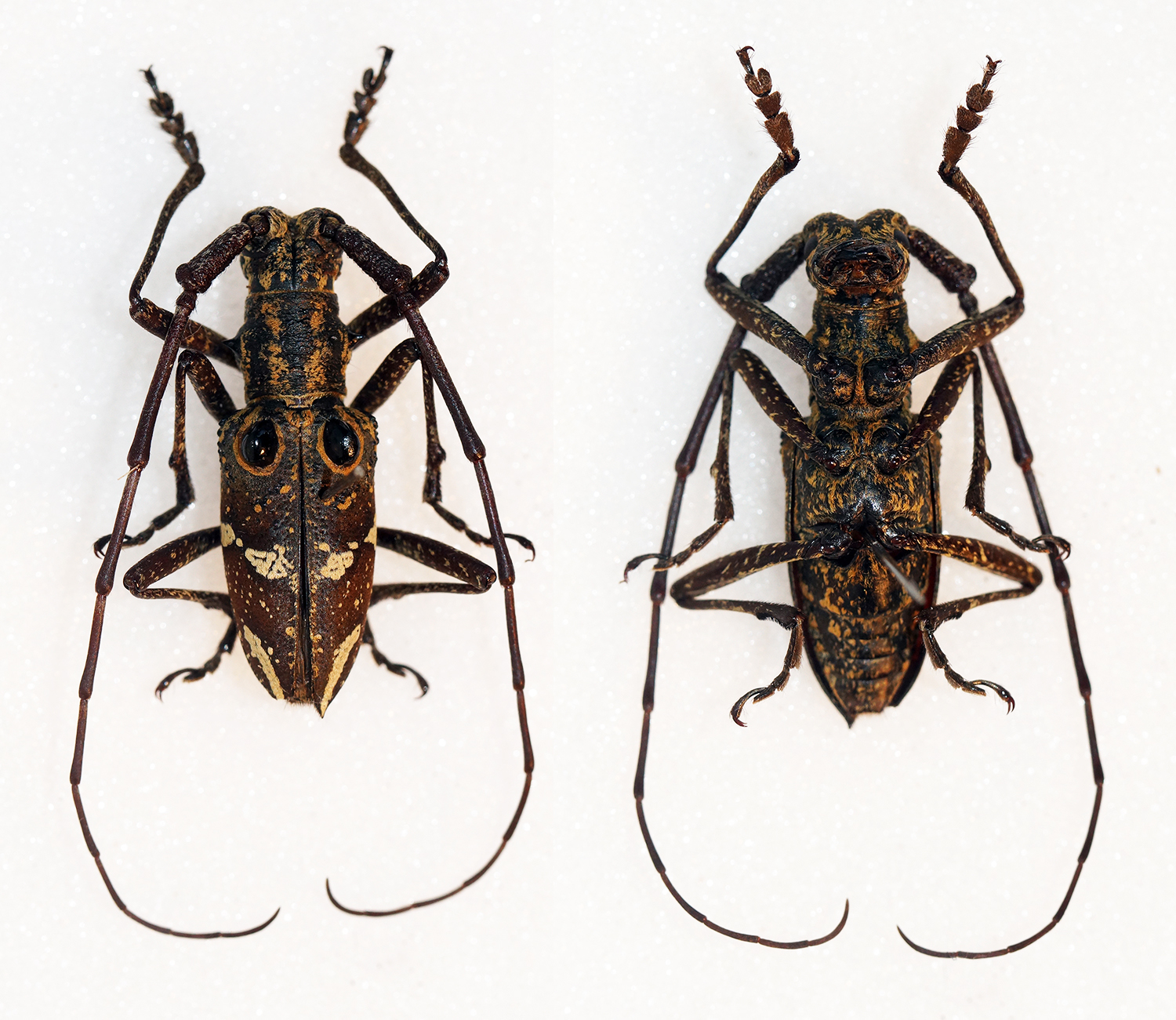
- Sex: Male, Size: 21.5mm

Scientific classification
- Kingdom: Animalia
- Phylum: Arthropoda
- Class: Insecta
- Order: Coleoptera
- Suborder: Polyphaga
- Infraorder: Cucujiformia
- Family: Cerambycidae
- Tribe: Phrissomini
- Genus: Pseudoechthistatus; Pic, 1917

= Pseudoechthistatus =

Genus of beetles

Pseudoechthistatus is a genus of longhorn beetles of the subfamily Lamiinae, containing the following species:

- Pseudoechthistatus acutipennis Chiang, 1981
- Pseudoechthistatus birmanicus Breuning, 1942
- Pseudoechthistatus chiangshunani Bi & Lin, 2016
- Pseudoechthistatus glabripennis Bi & Lin, 2016
- Pseudoechthistatus granulatus Breuning, 1942
- Pseudoechthistatus holzschuhi Bi & Lin, 2016
- Pseudoechthistatus obliquefasciatus Pic, 1917
- Pseudoechthistatus pufujiae Bi & Lin, 2016
- Pseudoechthistatus sinicus Bi & Lin, 2016
