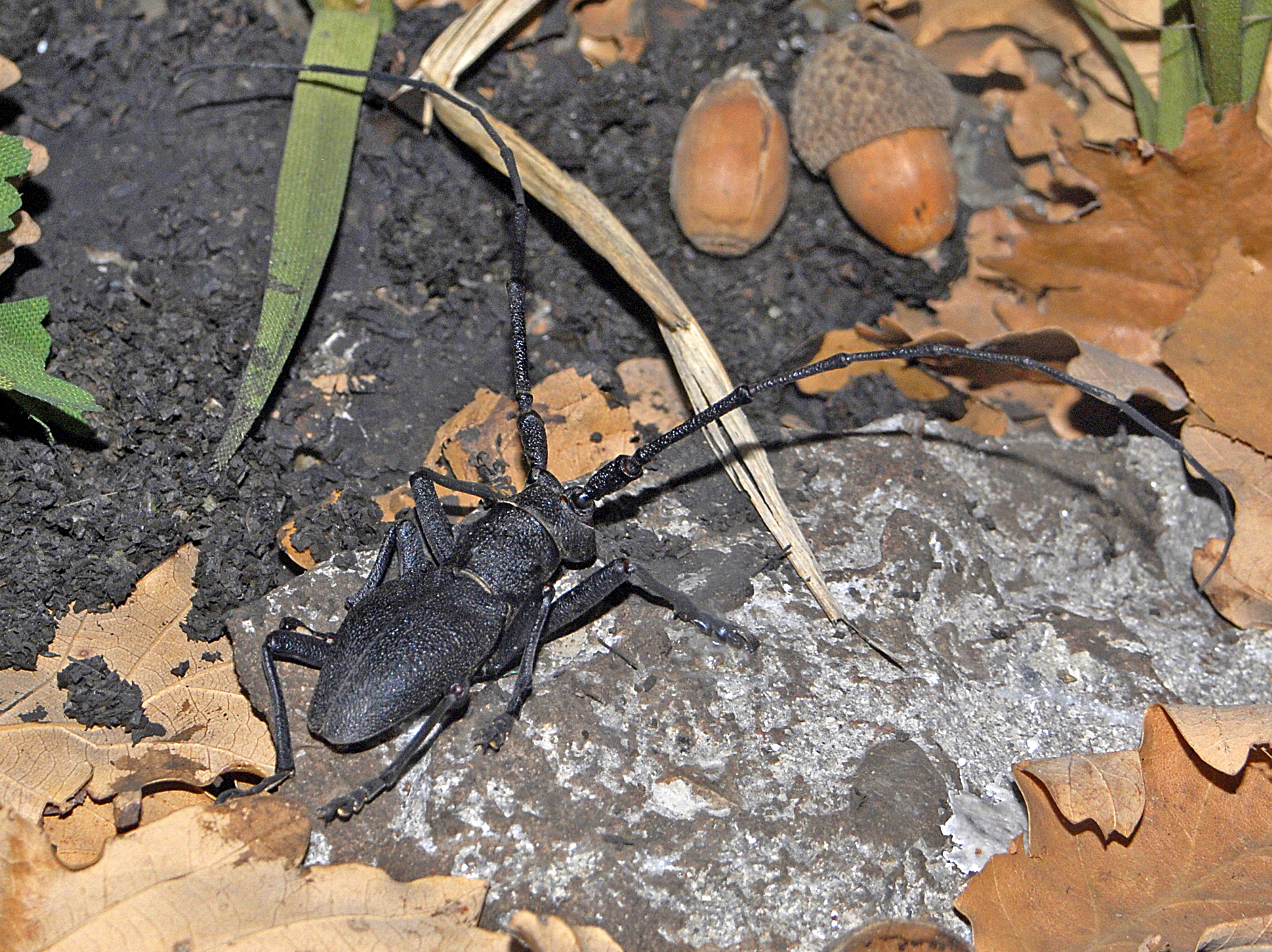
- Morimus asper

Scientific classification
- Domain: Eukaryota
- Kingdom: Animalia
- Phylum: Arthropoda
- Class: Insecta
- Order: Coleoptera
- Suborder: Polyphaga
- Infraorder: Cucujiformia
- Family: Cerambycidae
- Tribe: Phrissomini
- Genus: Morimus; Audinet-Serville, 1835

Synonyms
- Lamia (Morinus) Brullé, 1832 (Unav.)

= Morimus =

Genus of beetles

Morimus is a genus of beetle in family Cerambycidae.

== Species ==
- Morimus asper (Sulzer, 1776)
- Morimus assamensis Breuning, 1936
- Morimus funereus Mulsant, 1863
- Morimus granulipennis Breuning, 1939
- Morimus inaequalis Waterhouse, 1881
- Morimus indicus Breuning, 1936
- Morimus lethalis Thomson, 1857
- Morimus misellus Breuning, 1938
- Morimus orientalis Reitter, 1894
- Morimus ovalis Breuning, 1943
- Morimus plagiatus Waterhouse, 1881
- Morimus sexmaculipennis Breuning, 1961
