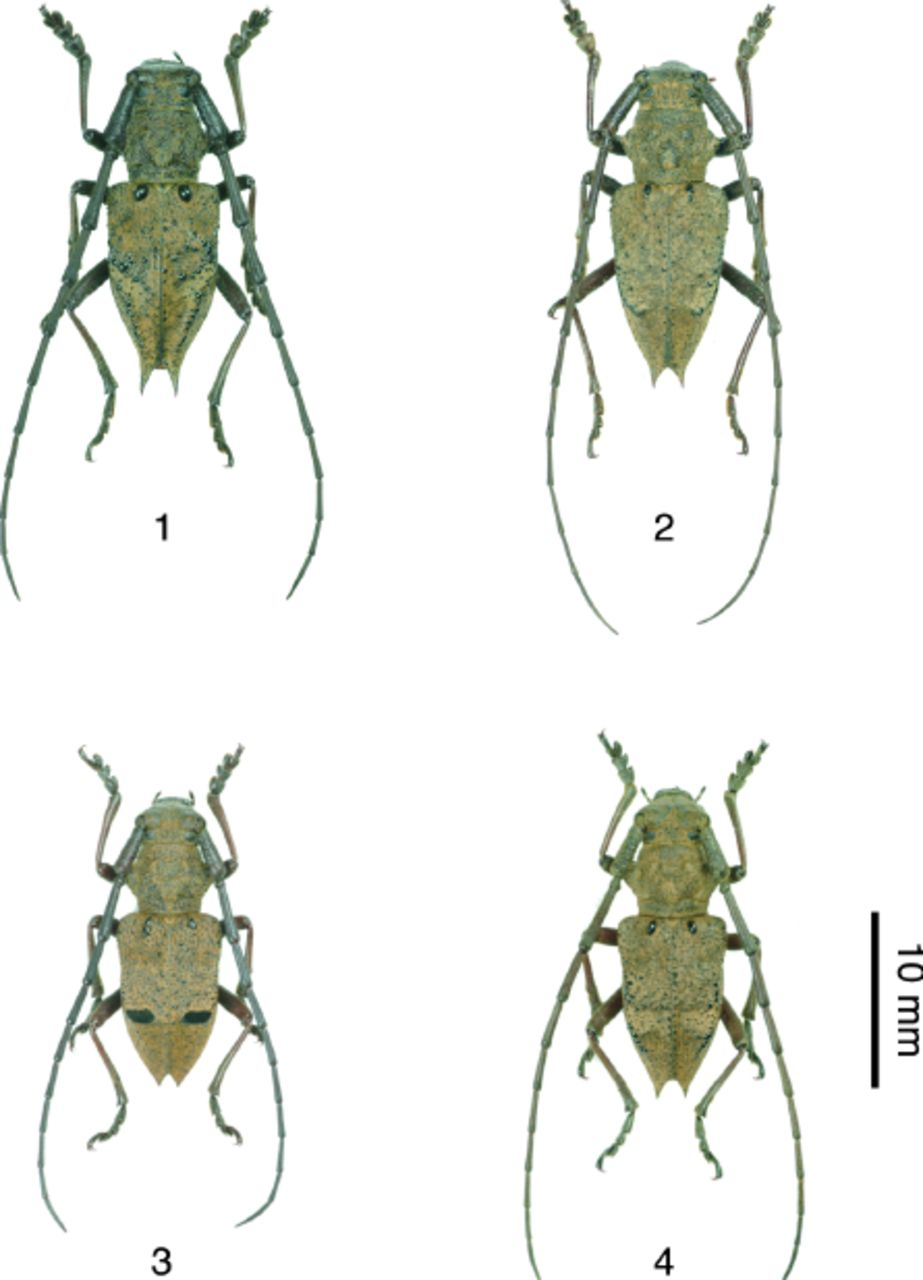
- 1. M. binodosus; 2. M. furciferus; 3. M. taniguchii; 4. M. fujisanus.

Scientific classification
- Kingdom: Animalia
- Phylum: Arthropoda
- Class: Insecta
- Order: Coleoptera
- Suborder: Polyphaga
- Infraorder: Cucujiformia
- Family: Cerambycidae
- Subfamily: Lamiinae
- Tribe: Phrissomini
- Genus: Mesechthistatus; Breuning, 1950

Type species
- Echthisatus binodosus Waterhouse, 1881
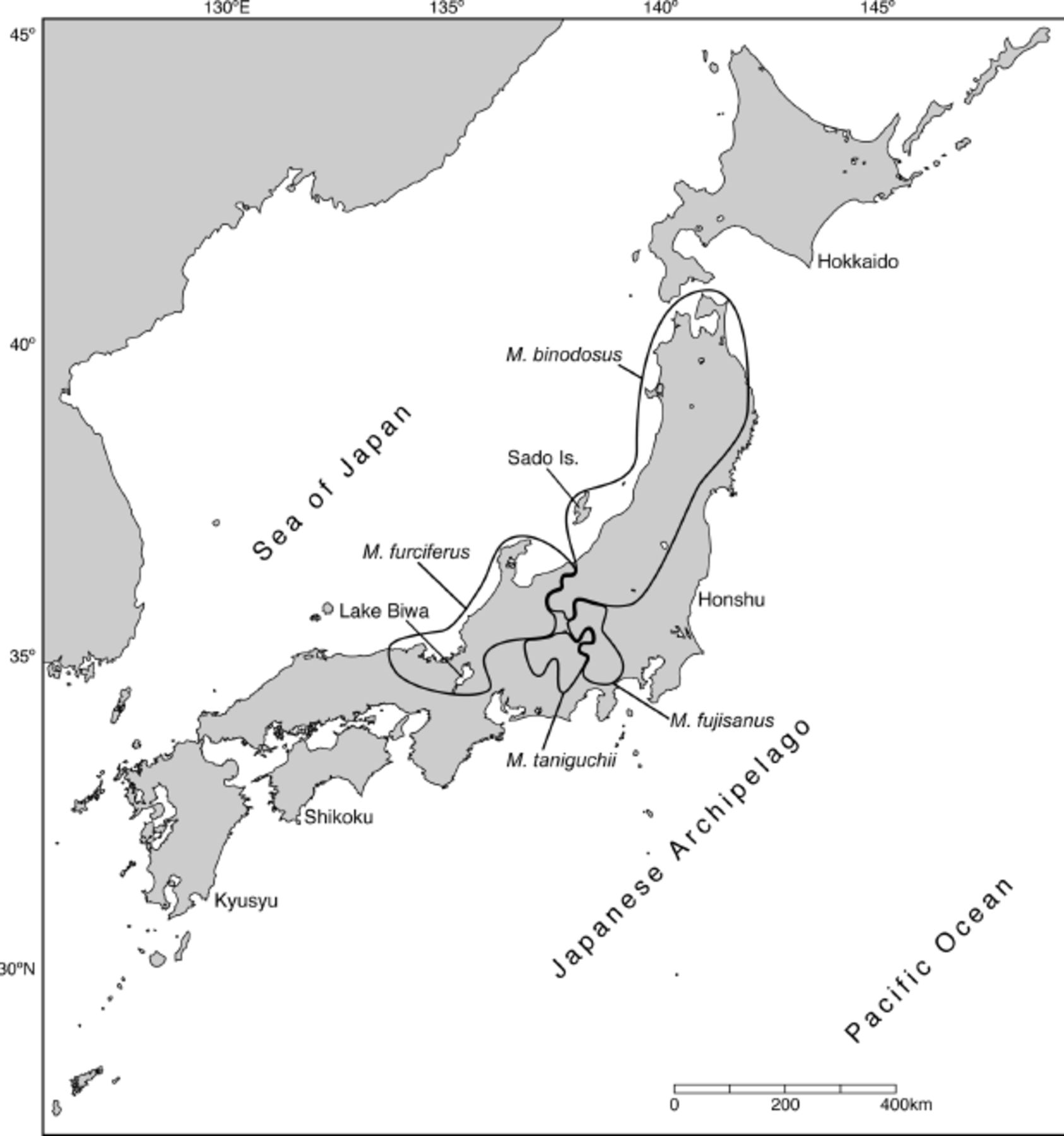
- Range of Mesechthistatus species on the Japanese islands of Honshu and Sado.

= Mesechthistatus =

Genus of beetles

Mesechthistatus is a genus of longhorn beetles of the subfamily Lamiinae. Mesechthistatus have atrophied hindwings and are thereby flightless.

== Species ==
There are four widely recognized species that all occur in Japan:

- Mesechthistatus binodosus (Waterhouse, 1881)
- Mesechthistatus fujisanus Hayashi, 1957
- Mesechthistatus furciferus (Bates, 1884)
- Mesechthistatus taniguchii (Seki, 1944)

Mesechthistatus taniguchii is also known from China. A fifth species, Mesechthistatus yamahoi Mitono, 1943 had not been recorded since the initial description of a specimen from Taiwan and its status as a species was deemed questionable by Nakamine & Takeda in 2008; however, it is treated as valid by the Catalogue of Life in Taiwan that also includes a modern photograph. Yet other sources place this species in its own monotypic genus, Mimechthistatus.
