= Macrospina =

Scientific classification
- Kingdom: Animalia
- Phylum: Arthropoda
- Class: Insecta
- Order: Coleoptera
- Suborder: Polyphaga
- Infraorder: Cucujiformia
- Family: Cerambycidae
- Genus: Macrospina
- Species: M. caboverdiana

Binomial name
- Macrospina caboverdiana Mateu, 1956

Genus of beetles

Macrospina caboverdiana is a species of beetle in the family Cerambycidae, and the only species in the genus Macrospina. It was described by Mateu in 1956.
