= Spinospasma =

Scientific classification
- Kingdom: Animalia
- Phylum: Arthropoda
- Class: Insecta
- Order: Coleoptera
- Suborder: Polyphaga
- Infraorder: Cucujiformia
- Family: Cerambycidae
- Genus: Spinospasma
- Species: S. hynesi

Binomial name
- Spinospasma hynesi Breuning, 1970

Genus of beetles

Spinospasma hynesi is a species of beetle in the family Cerambycidae, and the only species in the genus Spinospasma. It was described by Stephan von Breuning in 1970.
