= Phrissoma =

Scientific classification
- Kingdom: Animalia
- Phylum: Arthropoda
- Class: Insecta
- Order: Coleoptera
- Suborder: Polyphaga
- Infraorder: Cucujiformia
- Family: Cerambycidae
- Tribe: Phrissomini
- Genus: Phrissoma

Genus of beetles

Phrissomides (singular Phrissoma) is a genus of longhorn beetles of the subfamily Lamiinae.

Containing the following species:

- Phrissoma crispum (Fabricius, 1776)
- Phrissoma reichei (Thomson, 1865)
- Phrissoma terricolum (Thomson, 1864)

== Name ==
The term Phrissoma is formed from two Greek words, φρίσσω (phriso) which means "to be rough or uneven on the surface" and σῶμα (soma) which means "body", and is applied to these insects because not only the thorax but the whole of the upper surface is covered with spikes.
