= Trichostixis =

Scientific classification
- Kingdom: Animalia
- Phylum: Arthropoda
- Class: Insecta
- Order: Coleoptera
- Suborder: Polyphaga
- Infraorder: Cucujiformia
- Family: Cerambycidae
- Genus: Trichostixis
- Species: T. orientalis

Binomial name
- Trichostixis orientalis Breuning, 1936

Genus of beetles

Trichostixis orientalis is a species of beetle in the family Cerambycidae, and the only species in the genus Trichostixis. It was described by Stephan von Breuning in 1936.
