= Mimechthistatus =

Scientific classification
- Kingdom: Animalia
- Phylum: Arthropoda
- Class: Insecta
- Order: Coleoptera
- Suborder: Polyphaga
- Infraorder: Cucujiformia
- Family: Cerambycidae
- Genus: Mimechthistatus; Breuning, 1956
- Species: M. yamahoi

Binomial name
- Mimechthistatus yamahoi (Mitono, 1943)

Synonyms
- Echthistatus yamahoi Mitono, 1943; Parechthistatus yamahoi (Mitono, 1943); Mesechthistatus yamahoi (Mitono, 1943)

Genus of beetles

Mimechthistatus is a monotypic genus of beetles in the family Cerambycidae. The sole species is Mimechthistatus yamahoi. However, some sources place this species in the genus Mesechthistatus instead.

Mimechthistatus yamahoi is endemic to Taiwan.

== Description ==
Mimechthistatus yamahoi measure 15–16.5 mm (0.59–0.65 in). They are grey with a large black spot on the upper portions of the elytra. The antennae are longer than the body.
