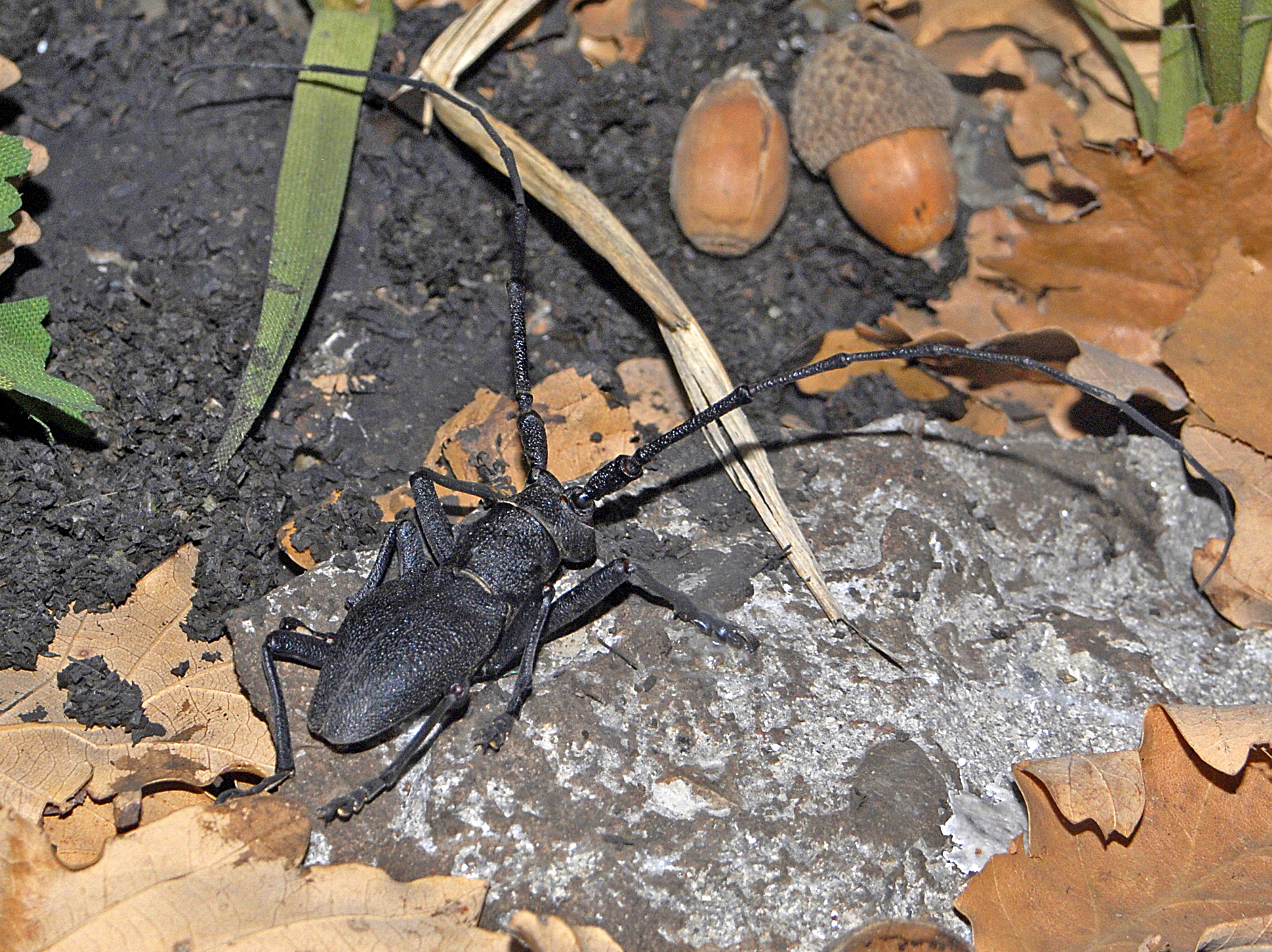
- Morimus asper

Scientific classification
- Kingdom: Animalia
- Phylum: Arthropoda
- Clade: Pancrustacea
- Class: Insecta
- Order: Coleoptera
- Suborder: Polyphaga
- Infraorder: Cucujiformia
- Family: Cerambycidae
- Genus: Morimus
- Species: M. asper

Binomial name
- Morimus asper (Sulzer, 1776)

Synonyms
- Cerambyx asper Sulzer, 1776; Lamia lugubris Fabricius, 1792; Morimus lugubris (Fabricius) Mulsant, 1839; Morinus asper (Sulzer) Sama, 1991; Lamia tristis (Linnaeus) Fabricius, 1787

= Morimus asper =

Species of beetle

Morimus asper is a species of beetle in family Cerambycidae.

== Etymology ==
The genus name "Morimus" derives from the Greek word "μόριμος" or "mórimos", meaning "destined to die", while the Latin species name "asper" (meaning "rough") refers to the surface of the elytra.

== Subspecies ==
- Morimus asper asper (Sulzer, 1767) - found from Sicily and Veneto in Italy to Brittany in France and Cantabrian Mountains of Spain
- Morimus asper ganglbaueri Reitter, 1884 - Two populations exist. The first one is found in Montenegro and bordering areas of Bosnia, Serbia and Albania. The second is found in northwestern Slovenia, western Croatia, and northeastern Italy
- Morimus asper graecus Danilevsky & al., 2016 - found in Peloponnese and Kefalonia in Greece
- Morimus asper verecundus (Faldermann, 1836) - Two populations exist. The first one is found in Hyrcarian Forests of Iran. The second one is found in northern Shaki-Zagatala in Azerbaijan, Georgia, from Vladikavkaz to Sevastopol in Russia and in the Pontic Mountains of Türkiye

== Description ==
Morimus asper can reach a length of 15–40 millimetres (0.59–1.57 in). This large and massive longhorn beetle has a black, elongated and oval body with very short, gray-brown hair and elytra are grainy over the entire surface. Males have more developed antennae. The subspecies Morimus asper funereus has gray-blue elytra with dark spots. The larvae are polyphagous, feeding mainly on deciduous and coniferous trees.

Adults can be found from March to October. They feed on bark, leaves and stems. Usually they hide during the day. Mating and oviposition take places mainly in the evening and at night, when they are active. Fights between the males with severe damages are common.

== Distribution ==
This species is widespread in southwestern, south and southeastern Europe (Albania, Armenia, Azerbaijan, Bosnia and Herzegovina, Bulgaria, Corsica, Croatia, France, Georgia, Greece, Iran, Italy, Montenegro, Romania, Russia, Sardinia, Sicily, Spain, Switzerland, Turkey, Belarus and Ukraine), and Turkmenistan.

In Spain it occupies the northern fringe between the provinces of Aragon, Asturias, Burgos, Catalonia, Navarre and the Basque Country.
