= Granulhepomidion =

Scientific classification
- Kingdom: Animalia
- Phylum: Arthropoda
- Class: Insecta
- Order: Coleoptera
- Suborder: Polyphaga
- Infraorder: Cucujiformia
- Family: Cerambycidae
- Genus: Granulhepomidion
- Species: G. granulipenne

Binomial name
- Granulhepomidion granulipenne (Breuning, 1953)

Synonyms
- Pseudohepomidion granulipenne Breuning, 1953

Genus of beetles

Granulhepomidion granulipenne is a species of beetle in the family Cerambycidae, and the only species in the genus Granulhepomidion. It was described by Stephan von Breuning in 1953.
