= Brimopsis =

Scientific classification
- Kingdom: Animalia
- Phylum: Arthropoda
- Class: Insecta
- Order: Coleoptera
- Suborder: Polyphaga
- Infraorder: Cucujiformia
- Family: Cerambycidae
- Genus: Brimopsis
- Species: B. kivuensis

Binomial name
- Brimopsis kivuensis (Breuning, 1936)

Genus of beetles

Brimopsis kivuensis is a species of beetle in the family Cerambycidae, and the only species in the genus Brimopsis. It was described by Stephan von Breuning in 1936.
