= Tricholamia =

Scientific classification
- Kingdom: Animalia
- Phylum: Arthropoda
- Class: Insecta
- Order: Coleoptera
- Suborder: Polyphaga
- Infraorder: Cucujiformia
- Family: Cerambycidae
- Tribe: Lamiini
- Genus: Tricholamia

Genus of beetles

Tricholamia is a genus of longhorn beetles of the subfamily Lamiinae, containing the following species:

- Tricholamia plagiata Bates, 1884
- Tricholamia ruficornis (Hintz, 1911)
