= Phrissomorimus =

Scientific classification
- Kingdom: Animalia
- Phylum: Arthropoda
- Class: Insecta
- Order: Coleoptera
- Suborder: Polyphaga
- Infraorder: Cucujiformia
- Family: Cerambycidae
- Genus: Phrissomorimus
- Species: P. brunneus

Binomial name
- Phrissomorimus brunneus Breuning & Itzinger, 1943

Genus of beetles

Phrissomorimus brunneus is a species of beetle in the family Cerambycidae, and the only species in the genus Phrissomorimus. It was described by Stephan von Breuning and Itzinger in 1943.
