= Parabrimus ruficornis =

Scientific classification
- Kingdom: Animalia
- Phylum: Arthropoda
- Class: Insecta
- Order: Coleoptera
- Suborder: Polyphaga
- Infraorder: Cucujiformia
- Family: Cerambycidae
- Genus: Parabrimus
- Species: P. ruficornis

Binomial name
- Parabrimus ruficornis Breuning, 1981

Species of beetle

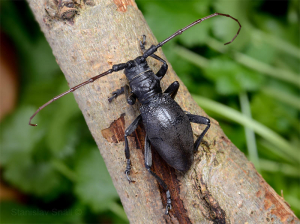

Parabrimus ruficornis is a species of beetle in the family Cerambycidae. It was described by Stephan von Breuning in 1981. The species is combined with the Parabrimus genus ranked in the Phrissomini tribe of Lamiinae.
