= Oriaethus =

Scientific classification
- Kingdom: Animalia
- Phylum: Arthropoda
- Class: Insecta
- Order: Coleoptera
- Suborder: Polyphaga
- Infraorder: Cucujiformia
- Family: Cerambycidae
- Genus: Oriaethus
- Species: O. longicornis

Binomial name
- Oriaethus longicornis Pascoe, 1864

Genus of beetles

Oriaethus longicornis is a species of beetle in the family Cerambycidae, and the only species in the genus Oriaethus. It was described by Pascoe in 1864.
