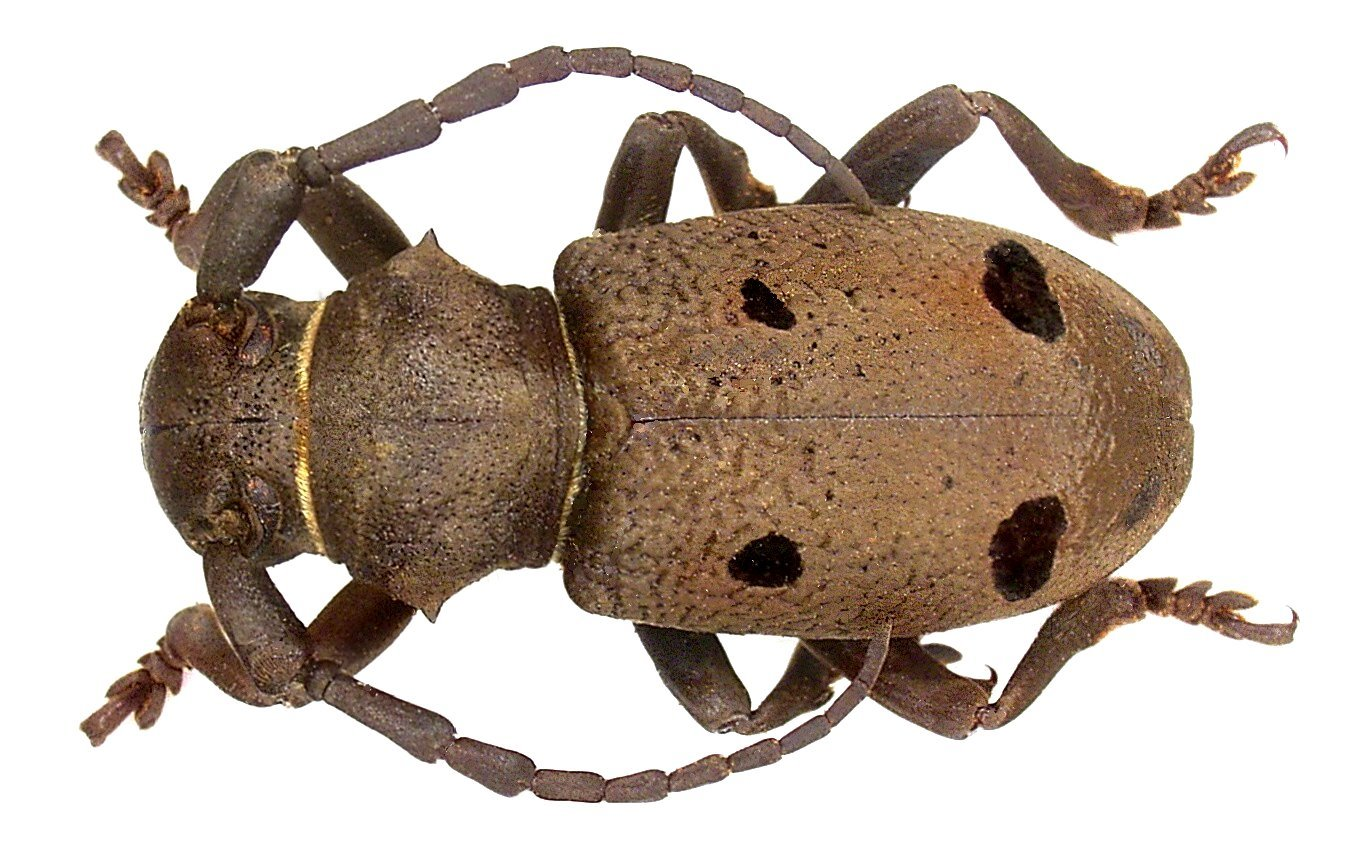

Scientific classification
- Kingdom: Animalia
- Phylum: Arthropoda
- Clade: Pancrustacea
- Class: Insecta
- Order: Coleoptera
- Suborder: Polyphaga
- Infraorder: Cucujiformia
- Family: Cerambycidae
- Genus: Herophila
- Species: H. tristis

Binomial name
- Herophila tristis (Linnaeus, 1767)

Synonyms
- Cerambyx adspersus Gmelin, 1790; Cerambyx funestus (Fabricius, 1787); Cerambyx pulverulentus Scopoli, 1772; Cerambyx tristis Linnaeus, 1767; Dorcatypus beieri Breuning, 1942; Dorcatypus tristis (Linnaeus, 1767); Herophila obsoleta (Fairmaire, 1859); Lamia funesta Fabricius, 1787; Morimus funestus (Fabricius, 1787); Morimus obsoletus Fairmaire, 1859

= Herophila tristis =

Species of beetle

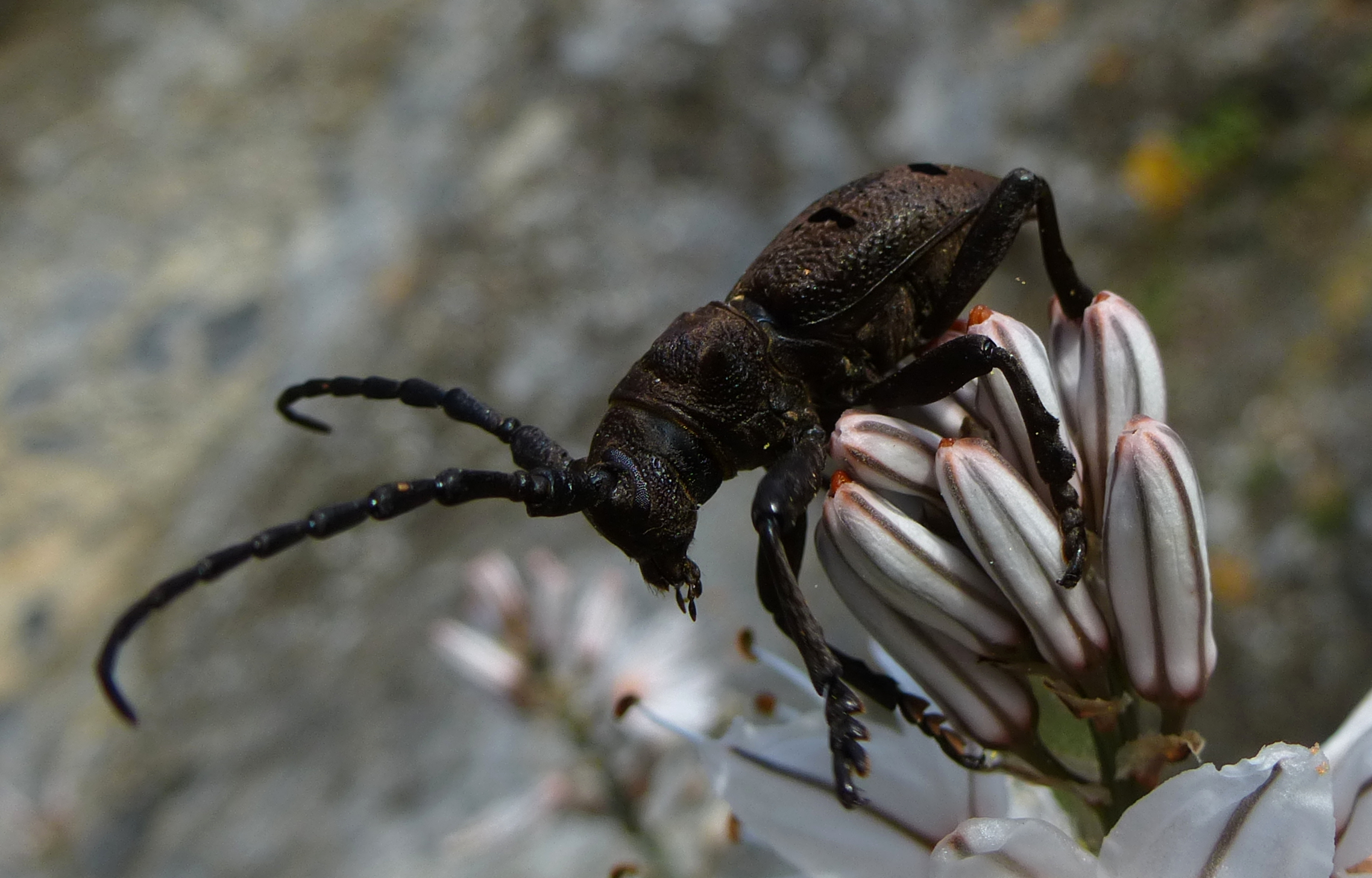
The lateral view of a Herophila tristis

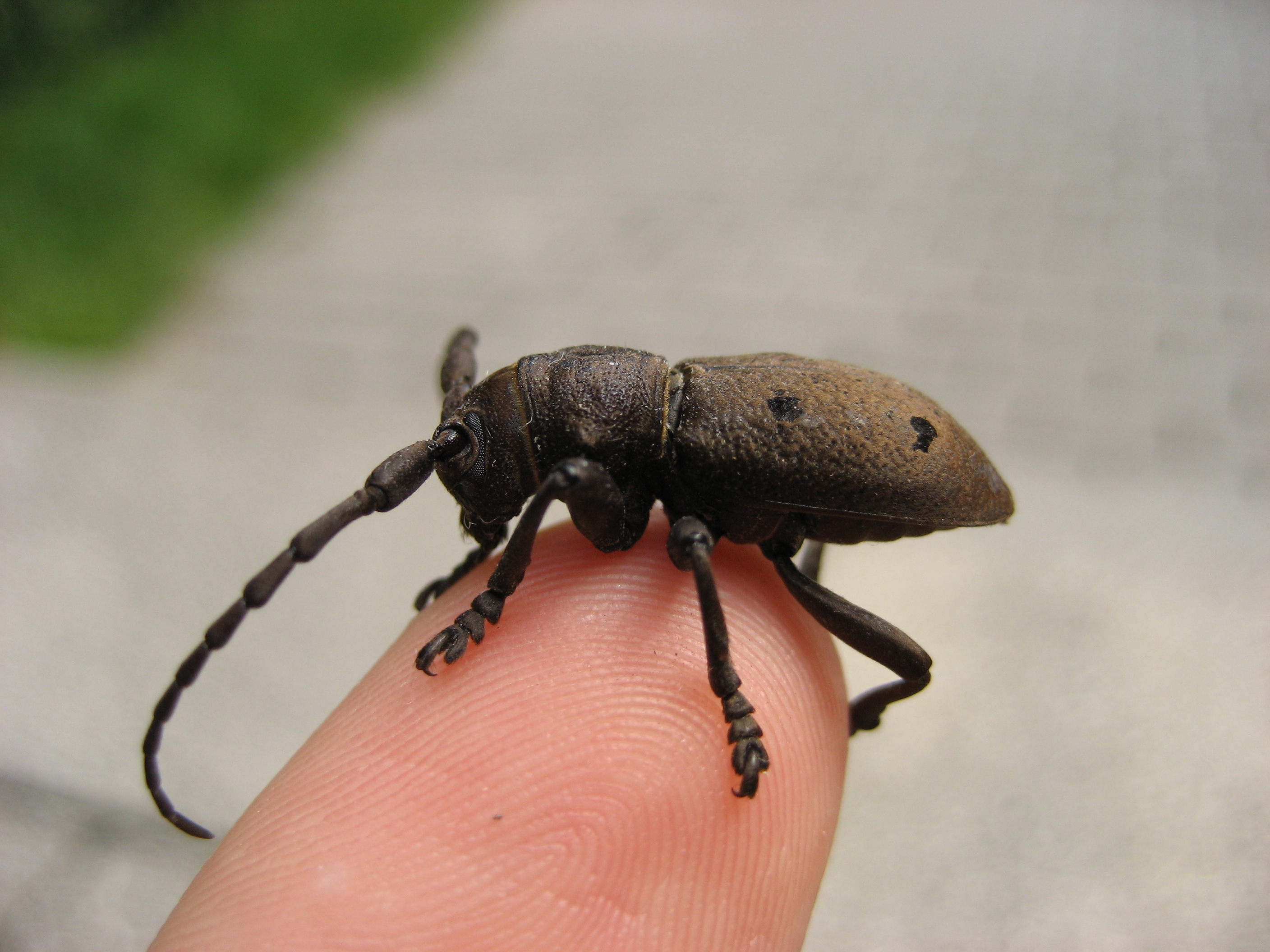
A Herophila tristis from Croatia

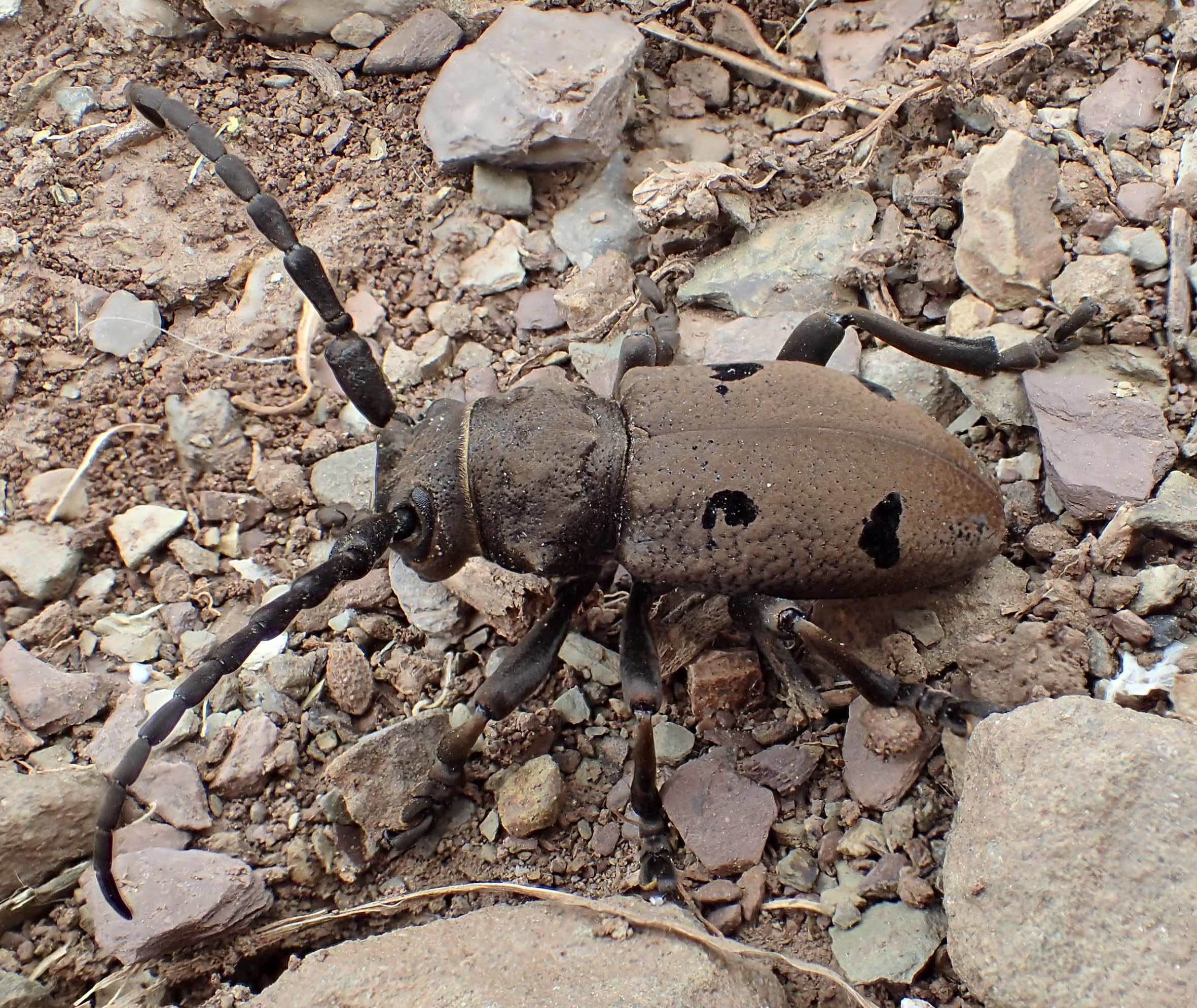
A Herophila tristis from Greece

Herophila tristis is a species of beetle in the family Cerambycidae, they are also called longhorned beetles. It was described by Carl Linnaeus in 1767, originally under the genus Cerambyx. It is known from Italy, Romania, Austria, Bulgaria, Crete, Croatia, Sardinia, France, Greece, Serbia, Montenegro, Corsica, Sicily, Hungary, Slovenia, Albania, and Turkey. It feeds on Morus alba, Ficus carica, and Robinia pseudoacacia. They live 2–3 years and are 13–26 mm long. Larvae feed under the bark of a range of broad-leaved trees, mostly Ficus carica commonly known as fig trees. As an adult they hide in the day and come out in the dusk.

== Subspecies ==
- Herophila tristis martinascoi (Contarini & Garagnani, 1983)
- Herophila tristis tristis (Linnaeus, 1767)
