= Hayashiechthistatus =

Scientific classification
- Kingdom: Animalia
- Phylum: Arthropoda
- Class: Insecta
- Order: Coleoptera
- Suborder: Polyphaga
- Infraorder: Cucujiformia
- Family: Cerambycidae
- Genus: Hayashiechthistatus
- Species: H. inexpectus

Binomial name
- Hayashiechthistatus inexpectus (Hayashi, 1959)

Genus of beetles

Hayashiechthistatus inexpectus is a species of beetle in the family Cerambycidae, and the only species in the genus Hayashiechthistatus. It was described by Hayashi in 1959.
