= Neotrachystola =

Scientific classification
- Kingdom: Animalia
- Phylum: Arthropoda
- Class: Insecta
- Order: Coleoptera
- Suborder: Polyphaga
- Infraorder: Cucujiformia
- Family: Cerambycidae
- Genus: Neotrachystola
- Species: N. maculipennis

Binomial name
- Neotrachystola maculipennis (Fairmaire, 1900)

Genus of beetles

Neotrachystola maculipennis is a species of beetle in the family Cerambycidae, and the only species in the genus Neotrachystola. It was described by Fairmaire in 1900.
