= Stixis (beetle) =

Scientific classification
- Domain: Eukaryota
- Kingdom: Animalia
- Phylum: Arthropoda
- Class: Insecta
- Order: Coleoptera
- Suborder: Polyphaga
- Infraorder: Cucujiformia
- Family: Cerambycidae
- Subfamily: Lamiinae
- Genus: Stixis; Gahan, 1890

Species
- See text

Genus of beetles

Stixis is a genus of longhorn beetles of the subfamily Lamiinae,

== Species ==
The genus contains the following species:

- Stixis grossepunctata Breuning, 1942
- Stixis itzingeri Breuning, 1936
- Stixis punctata Gahan, 1890
- Stixis usambarica Adlbauer, 2010
