= Morimopsini =

Scientific classification
- Kingdom: Animalia
- Phylum: Arthropoda
- Class: Insecta
- Order: Coleoptera
- Suborder: Polyphaga
- Infraorder: Cucujiformia
- Family: Cerambycidae
- Subfamily: Lamiinae
- Tribe: Morimopsini; Lacordaire, 1869

Tribe of beetles

Morimopsini is a tribe of longhorn beetles of the subfamily Lamiinae. It was described by Lacordaire in 1869.

== Taxonomy ==
- Aconodes Pascoe, 1857
- Anerpa Gahan, 1907
- Anexodus Pascoe, 1886
- Apomempsis Pascoe, 1864
- Apomempsoides Breuning, 1950
- Bulbotrachystola Vitali & Yanega, 2019
- Caparmena Sudre & Teocchi, 2002
- Centruropsis Breuning, 1950
- Dolichostyrax Aurivillius, 1911
- Dolopharoides Breuning, 1978
- Dolophrades Bates, 1884
- Dorcadiopsis Müller, 1941
- Echthistatodes Gressitt, 1938
- Falsotrachystola Breuning, 1950
- Haploparmena Aurivillius, 1913
- Kenyavelleda Teocchi, 1999
- Lamidorcadion Pic, 1934
- Lepromoris Pascoe, 1864
- Microdorcadion Pic, 1925
- Mimodorcadion Breuning, 1942
- Mimogrynex Breuning, 1939
- Mimovelleda Breuning, 1940
- Monoxenus Kolbe, 1893
- Morimidius Breuning, 1939
- Morimolamia Breuning, 1954
- Morimonella Podaný, 1979
- Morimopsis Thomson, 1857
- Mycerinodes Kolbe, 1894
- Niphoparmena Aurivillius, 1903
- Niphoparmenoides Breuning, 1978
- Obages Pascoe, 1866
- Opsies Pascoe, 1864
- Pantilema Aurivillius, 1911
- Paramonoxenus Breuning, 1970
- Parmenolamia Breuning, 1950
- Parobages Breuning, 1940
- Paroriaethus Breuning, 1936
- Phrissomidius Breuning, 1939
- Pirulintia Simonetta & Teocchi, 1995
- Protilema Aurivillius, 1908
- Protilemoides Kriesche, 1923
- Pseudhepomidion Breuning, 1936
- Pseudobrimus Breuning, 1936
- Pseudomonoxenus Breuning, 1958
- Sinodorcadion Gressitt, 1939
- Somatovelleda Breuning, 1943
- Spinocentruropsis Minet, 1987
- Stenoparmena Thomson, 1864
- Tuberolamia Breuning, 1940
