= Monoxenus nodosus =

Scientific classification
- Kingdom: Animalia
- Phylum: Arthropoda
- Class: Insecta
- Order: Coleoptera
- Suborder: Polyphaga
- Infraorder: Cucujiformia
- Family: Cerambycidae
- Genus: Monoxenus
- Species: M. nodosus

Binomial name
- Monoxenus nodosus (Hintz, 1916)

Synonyms
- Apomempsis nodosa Hintz, 1916

Species of beetle

Monoxenus nodosus is a species of beetle in the family Cerambycidae. It was described by Hintz in 1916, originally under the genus Apomempsis.
