= Papus (disambiguation) =

Papus was a pseudonym of the French physician, hypnotist, and occultist Gérard Encausse (1865–1916), founder of the modern Martinist Order.

Papus may also refer to:

- El Papus, a Spanish satirical magazine
- a Roman family name; see Aemilia gens § Aemilii Papi
  - Quintus Aemilius Papus (3rd century BC), Roman general and statesman
  - Lucius Aemilius Papus (3rd century BC), Roman general and statesman who held a series of offices in the emperor's service
  - Marcus Aemilius Papus (2nd century BC), Roman senator
- Protilema papus, an Indonesian species of beetle in the family Cerambycidae

== See also ==
- Pappus (disambiguation)
