= Apomempsoides trispinosa =

Scientific classification
- Domain: Eukaryota
- Kingdom: Animalia
- Phylum: Arthropoda
- Class: Insecta
- Order: Coleoptera
- Suborder: Polyphaga
- Infraorder: Cucujiformia
- Family: Cerambycidae
- Genus: Apomempsoides
- Species: A. trispinosa

Binomial name
- Apomempsoides trispinosa (Jordan, 1894)

Synonyms
- Apomempsis trispinosa Jordan, 1894

Species of beetle

Apomempsoides trispinosa is a species of beetle in the family Cerambycidae. It was described by Karl Jordan in 1894, originally under the genus of Apomempsis.
