= Monoxenus bispinosus =

Scientific classification
- Kingdom: Animalia
- Phylum: Arthropoda
- Class: Insecta
- Order: Coleoptera
- Suborder: Polyphaga
- Infraorder: Cucujiformia
- Family: Cerambycidae
- Genus: Monoxenus
- Species: M. bispinosus

Binomial name
- Monoxenus bispinosus (Jordan, 1894)

Synonyms
- Apomempsis bispinosa Jordan, 1894; Didymodonta olivascens Aurivillius, 1903

Species of beetle

Monoxenus bispinosus is a species of beetle in the family Cerambycidae. It was described by Karl Jordan in 1894, originally under the genus Apomempsis. It is known from Cameroon, Equatorial Guinea, Gabon, the Democratic Republic of the Congo, the Republic of the Congo, and the Central African Republic.
