= Monoxenus bufoides =

Scientific classification
- Kingdom: Animalia
- Phylum: Arthropoda
- Class: Insecta
- Order: Coleoptera
- Suborder: Polyphaga
- Infraorder: Cucujiformia
- Family: Cerambycidae
- Genus: Monoxenus
- Species: M. bufoides

Binomial name
- Monoxenus bufoides (Jordan, 1894)

Synonyms
- Apomempsis bufoides Jordan, 1894

Species of beetle

Monoxenus bufoides is a species of beetle in the family Cerambycidae. It was described by Karl Jordan in 1894, originally under the genus Apomempsis.
