= Falsotrachystola asidiformis =

Scientific classification
- Kingdom: Animalia
- Phylum: Arthropoda
- Class: Insecta
- Order: Coleoptera
- Suborder: Polyphaga
- Infraorder: Cucujiformia
- Family: Cerambycidae
- Genus: Falsotrachystola
- Species: F. asidiformis

Binomial name
- Falsotrachystola asidiformis (Pic, 1915)

Synonyms
- Trachystola asidiformis Pic, 1915

Species of beetle

Falsotrachystola asidiformis is a species of beetle in the family Cerambycidae. It was described by Maurice Pic in 1915, originally under the genus Trachystola.
