= Aconodes bulbosus =

Scientific classification
- Kingdom: Animalia
- Phylum: Arthropoda
- Class: Insecta
- Order: Coleoptera
- Suborder: Polyphaga
- Infraorder: Cucujiformia
- Family: Cerambycidae
- Genus: Aconodes
- Species: A. bulbosus

Binomial name
- Aconodes bulbosus Breuning, 1956

Synonyms
- Aconodes bulbosa Breuning, 1956 (misspelling)

Species of beetle

Aconodes bulbosus is a species of beetle in the family Cerambycidae. It was described by Stephan von Breuning in 1956. It is known from Thailand.
