= Monoxenus nigrofasciaticollis =

Scientific classification
- Kingdom: Animalia
- Phylum: Arthropoda
- Clade: Pancrustacea
- Class: Insecta
- Order: Coleoptera
- Suborder: Polyphaga
- Infraorder: Cucujiformia
- Family: Cerambycidae
- Genus: Monoxenus
- Species: M. nigrofasciaticollis

Binomial name
- Monoxenus nigrofasciaticollis Breuning, 1967

Species of beetle

Monoxenus nigrofasciaticollis is a species of beetle in the family Cerambycidae. It was described by Stephan von Breuning in 1967. It is known from Kenya. It feeds on Juniperus procera.
