= Mycerinodes lettowvorbecki =

Scientific classification
- Kingdom: Animalia
- Phylum: Arthropoda
- Class: Insecta
- Order: Coleoptera
- Suborder: Polyphaga
- Infraorder: Cucujiformia
- Family: Cerambycidae
- Genus: Mycerinodes
- Species: M. lettowvorbecki

Binomial name
- Mycerinodes lettowvorbecki Kriesche, 1926

Synonyms
- Mycerinodes Lettow-Vorbecki Kriesche, 1926

Species of beetle

Mycerinodes lettowvorbecki is a species of beetle in the family Cerambycidae. It was described by Kriesche in 1926, originally spelled as "Mycerinodes Lettow-Vorbecki".
