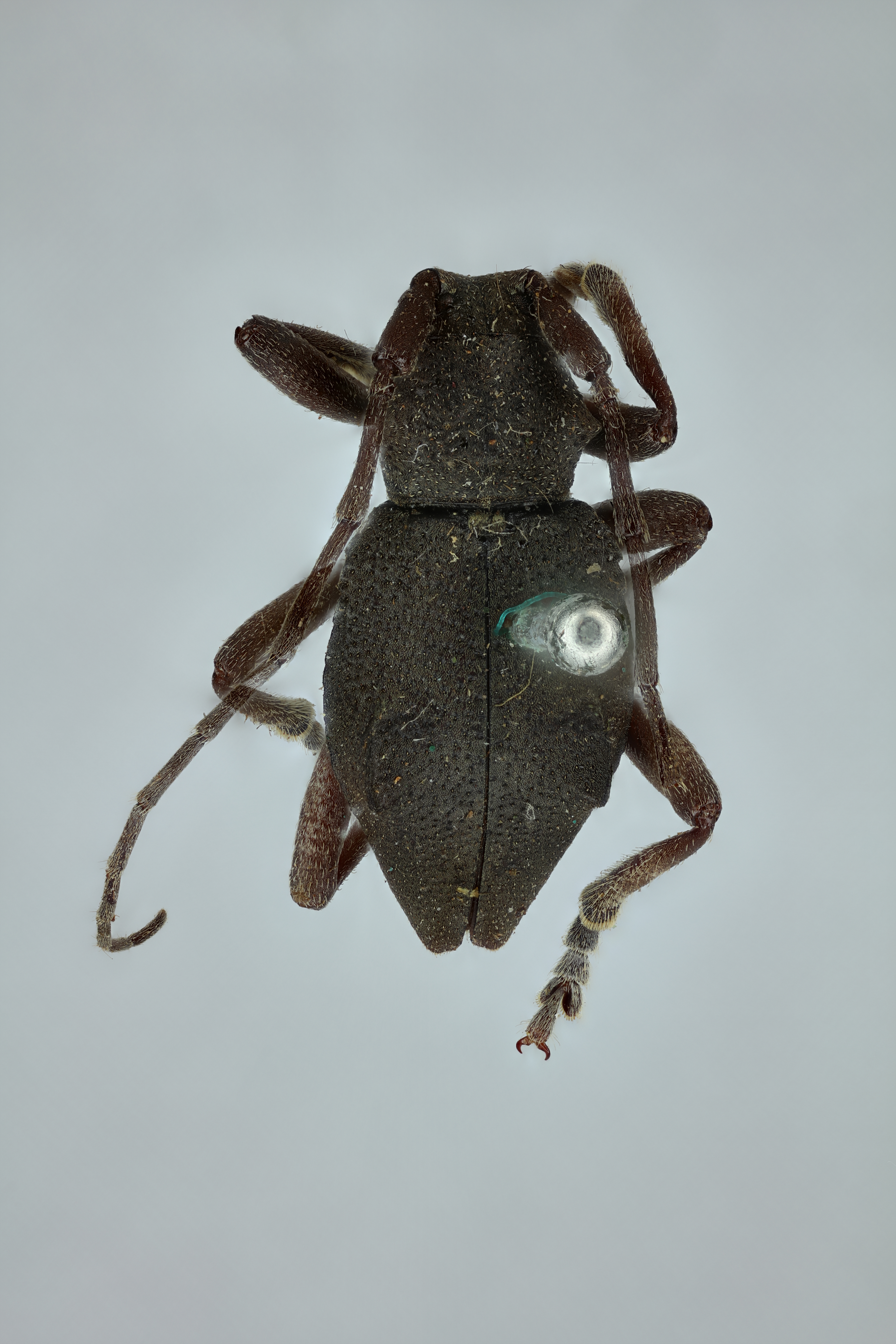

Scientific classification
- Kingdom: Animalia
- Phylum: Arthropoda
- Class: Insecta
- Order: Coleoptera
- Suborder: Polyphaga
- Infraorder: Cucujiformia
- Family: Cerambycidae
- Genus: Monoxenus
- Species: M. infraflavescens

Binomial name
- Monoxenus infraflavescens Breuning, 1949

= Monoxenus infraflavescens =

Species of beetle

Monoxenus infraflavescens is a species of beetle in the family Cerambycidae. It was described by Stephan von Breuning in 1949.
