= Anexodus aquilus =

Scientific classification
- Kingdom: Animalia
- Phylum: Arthropoda
- Class: Insecta
- Order: Coleoptera
- Suborder: Polyphaga
- Infraorder: Cucujiformia
- Family: Cerambycidae
- Genus: Anexodus
- Species: A. aquilus

Binomial name
- Anexodus aquilus Pascoe, 1886

Synonyms
- Anexodus kuntzeni Kriesche, 1924

Species of beetle

Anexodus aquilus is a species of beetle in the family Cerambycidae. Described by Francis Polkinghorne Pascoe in 1886, it is found in Borneo.
