= Mimogrynex =

Scientific classification
- Kingdom: Animalia
- Phylum: Arthropoda
- Class: Insecta
- Order: Coleoptera
- Suborder: Polyphaga
- Infraorder: Cucujiformia
- Family: Cerambycidae
- Tribe: Morimopsini
- Genus: Mimogrynex; Breuning, 1939
- Species: M. densepunctatus

Binomial name
- Mimogrynex densepunctatus Breuning, 1939

Genus of beetles

Mimogrynex densepunctatus is a species of beetle in the family Cerambycidae, and the only species in the genus Mimogrynex. It was described by Stephan von Breuning in 1939.

The type locality for M. densepunctatus is Kodaikanal, India, and this species is 11.5 mm long and 4 mm wide.
