= Stenoparmena nigra =

Scientific classification
- Kingdom: Animalia
- Phylum: Arthropoda
- Class: Insecta
- Order: Coleoptera
- Suborder: Polyphaga
- Infraorder: Cucujiformia
- Family: Cerambycidae
- Genus: Stenoparmena
- Species: S. nigra

Binomial name
- Stenoparmena nigra Breuning & Téocchi, 1983

Species of beetle

Stenoparmena nigra is a species of beetle in the family Cerambycidae. It was described by Stephan von Breuning and Pierre Téocchi in 1983.
