= Monoxenus elongatus =

Scientific classification
- Kingdom: Animalia
- Phylum: Arthropoda
- Class: Insecta
- Order: Coleoptera
- Suborder: Polyphaga
- Infraorder: Cucujiformia
- Family: Cerambycidae
- Genus: Monoxenus
- Species: M. elongatus

Binomial name
- Monoxenus elongatus Breuning, 1939

Synonyms
- Monoxenus (Dityloderus) elongatus Breuning, 1939

Species of beetle

Monoxenus elongatus is a species of beetle in the family Cerambycidae. It was described by Stephan von Breuning in 1939.

It's 16 mm long and 6 mm wide, and its type locality is Mount Meru, Tanzania.

== Subspecies ==
- Monoxenus elongatus elongatus Breuning, 1939
- Monoxenus elongatus ngorongorensis Breuning, 1960
