= Aconodes lima =

Scientific classification
- Domain: Eukaryota
- Kingdom: Animalia
- Phylum: Arthropoda
- Class: Insecta
- Order: Coleoptera
- Suborder: Polyphaga
- Infraorder: Cucujiformia
- Family: Cerambycidae
- Genus: Aconodes
- Species: A. lima

Binomial name
- Aconodes lima Holzschuh, 1989

Species of beetle

Aconodes lima is a species of beetle in the family Cerambycidae. It was described by Holzschuh in 1989. It is known from Bhutan.
