= Dolichostyrax tuberculatus =

Scientific classification
- Kingdom: Animalia
- Phylum: Arthropoda
- Class: Insecta
- Order: Coleoptera
- Suborder: Polyphaga
- Infraorder: Cucujiformia
- Family: Cerambycidae
- Genus: Dolichostyrax
- Species: D. tuberculatus

Binomial name
- Dolichostyrax tuberculatus Fisher, 1936

Species of beetle

Dolichostyrax tuberculatus is a species of beetle in the family Cerambycidae. It was described by Warren Samuel Fisher in 1936. It is known from Indonesia.
