= Monoxenus =

Scientific classification
- Kingdom: Animalia
- Phylum: Arthropoda
- Class: Insecta
- Order: Coleoptera
- Suborder: Polyphaga
- Infraorder: Cucujiformia
- Family: Cerambycidae
- Subfamily: Lamiinae
- Tribe: Morimopsini
- Genus: Monoxenus; Kolbe, 1893

Synonyms
- Didymodonta Aurivillius, 1903 [= Bothynoscelis]; Parapomempsoides Breuning, 1981 [= Bothynoscelis]; Mimophrissoma Sudre & Téocchi, 2001 [= Dityloderus]

Genus of beetles

Monoxenus is a genus of longhorn beetles of the subfamily Lamiinae, containing the following species:

subgenus Bothynoscelis

- Monoxenus bicristatus Breuning, 1939
- Monoxenus bispinosus (Jordan, 1894)
- Monoxenus horridus (Hintz, 1911)
- Monoxenus lujae (Hintz, 1911)
- Monoxenus tridentatus (Aurivillius, 1903)

subgenus Dityloderus

- Monoxenus aethiopicus (Müller, 1941)
- Monoxenus balteatus (Aurivillius, 1903)
- Monoxenus balteoides Breuning, 1939
- Monoxenus bicarinatus Breuning, 1942
- Monoxenus bufoides (Jordan, 1894)
- Monoxenus declivis Hintz, 1911
- Monoxenus elevatus Aurivillius, 1926
- Monoxenus elongatus Breuning, 1939
- Monoxenus flavescens Breuning, 1939
- Monoxenus fuliginosus Gahan, 1898
- Monoxenus infraflavescens Breuning, 1949
- Monoxenus kenyensis Breuning, 1940
- Monoxenus mambojae Breuning, 1973
- Monoxenus multispinosus Breuning, 1939
- Monoxenus multituberculatus Breuning, 1942
- Monoxenus nigrofasciaticollis Breuning, 1967
- Monoxenus nigrovitticollis Breuning, 1956
- Monoxenus nodosoides Breuning, 1939
- Monoxenus nodosus (Hintz, 1916)
- Monoxenus ruandae Breuning, 1955
- Monoxenus spinosus Breuning, 1939
- Monoxenus strandi Breuning, 1939
- Monoxenus teocchii Breuning, 1970
- Monoxenus turrifer Aurivillius, 1914
- Monoxenus unispinosus Breuning, 1939
- Monoxenus werneri Teocchi & al., 2010

subgenus Monoxenus

- Monoxenus spinator Kolbe, 1893
