= Morimopsis =

Scientific classification
- Domain: Eukaryota
- Kingdom: Animalia
- Phylum: Arthropoda
- Class: Insecta
- Order: Coleoptera
- Suborder: Polyphaga
- Infraorder: Cucujiformia
- Family: Cerambycidae
- Subfamily: Lamiinae
- Tribe: Morimopsini
- Genus: Morimopsis; Thomson, 1857

Genus of beetles

Morimopsis is a genus of longhorn beetles of the subfamily Lamiinae, containing the following species:

- Morimopsis assamensis Breuning, 1965
- Morimopsis dalihodi Holzschuh, 2003
- Morimopsis glabripennis Holzschuh, 2003
- Morimopsis lacrymans Thomson, 1857
- Morimopsis mussardi Breuning, 1965
- Morimopsis truncatipennis Breuning, 1940
- Morimopsis unicolor Breuning, 1975
