= Protilema gigas =

Scientific classification
- Domain: Eukaryota
- Kingdom: Animalia
- Phylum: Arthropoda
- Class: Insecta
- Order: Coleoptera
- Suborder: Polyphaga
- Infraorder: Cucujiformia
- Family: Cerambycidae
- Genus: Protilema
- Species: P. gigas

Binomial name
- Protilema gigas Aurivillius, 1908

Species of beetle

Protilema gigas is a species of beetle in the family Cerambycidae. It was described by Per Olof Christopher Aurivillius in 1908 and is known from Papua New Guinea.
