= Pseudobrimus gabonicus =

Scientific classification
- Kingdom: Animalia
- Phylum: Arthropoda
- Class: Insecta
- Order: Coleoptera
- Suborder: Polyphaga
- Infraorder: Cucujiformia
- Family: Cerambycidae
- Genus: Pseudobrimus
- Species: P. gabonicus

Binomial name
- Pseudobrimus gabonicus Breuning, 1936

Synonyms
- Parabrimus gabonicus Breuning, 1967

Species of beetle

Pseudobrimus gabonicus is a species of beetle in the family Cerambycidae. It was described by Stephan von Breuning in 1936.
