= Trachystola scabripennis =

Scientific classification
- Kingdom: Animalia
- Phylum: Arthropoda
- Clade: Pancrustacea
- Class: Insecta
- Order: Coleoptera
- Suborder: Polyphaga
- Infraorder: Cucujiformia
- Family: Cerambycidae
- Genus: Trachystola
- Species: T. scabripennis

Binomial name
- Trachystola scabripennis Pascoe, 1862

Species of beetle

Trachystola scabripennis is a species of longhorn beetle in the family Cerambycidae. It was described by Francis Polkinghorne Pascoe in 1862. It is known from Java, Vietnam, Sumatra, and Borneo.
