= Protilema rotundipenne =

Scientific classification
- Kingdom: Animalia
- Phylum: Arthropoda
- Class: Insecta
- Order: Coleoptera
- Suborder: Polyphaga
- Infraorder: Cucujiformia
- Family: Cerambycidae
- Genus: Protilema
- Species: P. rotundipenne

Binomial name
- Protilema rotundipenne Breuning, 1947

Species of beetle

Protilema rotundipenne is a species of beetle in the family Cerambycidae. It was described by Stephan von Breuning in 1947.
