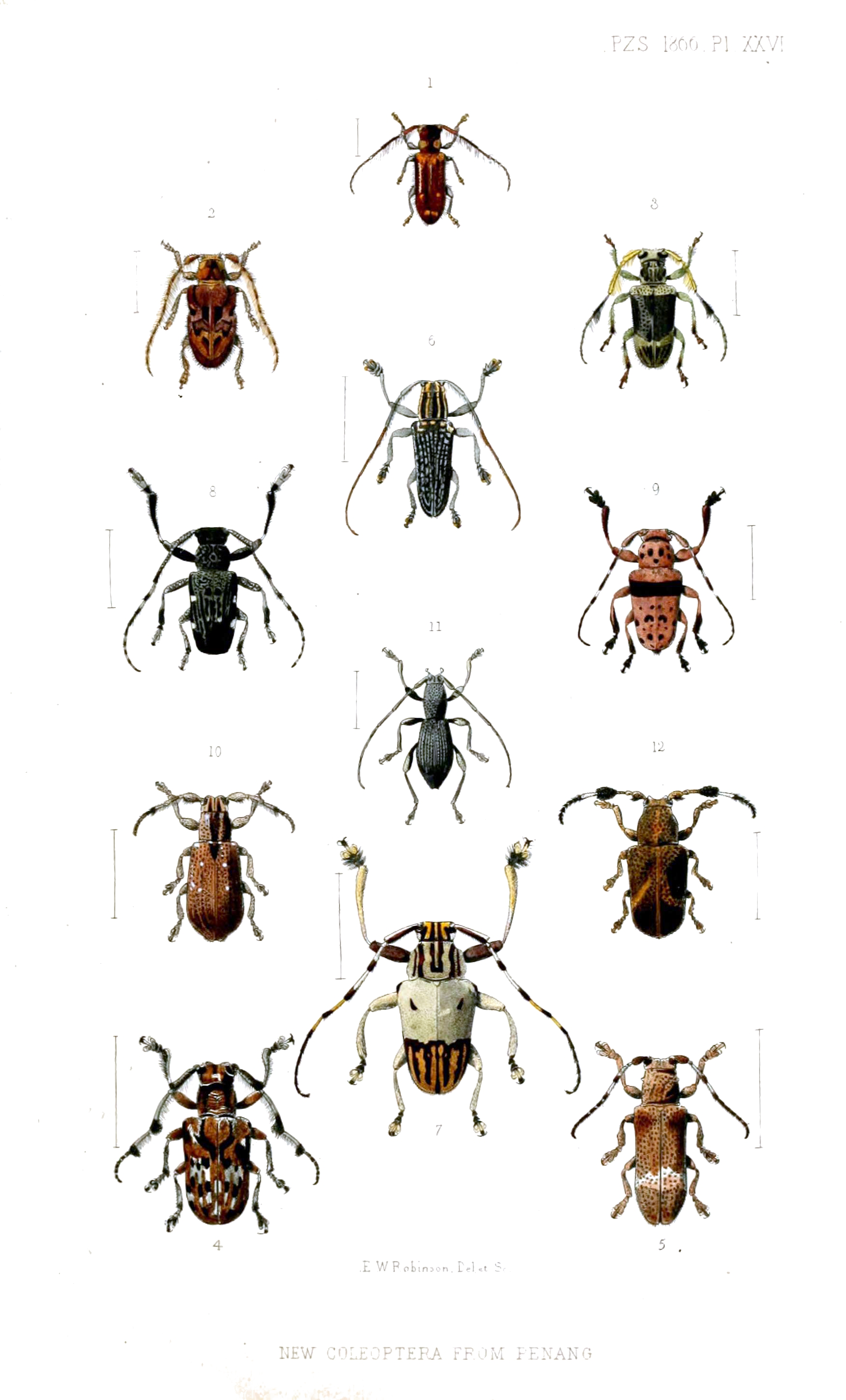

Scientific classification
- Kingdom: Animalia
- Phylum: Arthropoda
- Clade: Pancrustacea
- Class: Insecta
- Order: Coleoptera
- Suborder: Polyphaga
- Infraorder: Cucujiformia
- Family: Cerambycidae
- Tribe: Morimopsini
- Genus: Obages

= Obages =

Genus of beetles

Obages is a genus of longhorn beetles of the subfamily Lamiinae, containing the following species:

- Obages cameroni Breuning, 1972
- Obages flavosticticus Breuning, 1939
- Obages palparis Pascoe, 1866
- Obages tuberculipennis Breuning, 1961
- Obages tuberculosus Breuning, 1973
