= Lamidorcadion annulipes =

Scientific classification
- Kingdom: Animalia
- Phylum: Arthropoda
- Class: Insecta
- Order: Coleoptera
- Suborder: Polyphaga
- Infraorder: Cucujiformia
- Family: Cerambycidae
- Genus: Lamidorcadion
- Species: L. annulipes

Binomial name
- Lamidorcadion annulipes Pic, 1934

Synonyms
- Lamiodorcadion annulipes Breuning, 1961 (Missp.)

Species of beetle

Lamidorcadion annulipes is a species of beetle in the family Cerambycidae. It was described by Maurice Pic in 1934.
