= Aconodes subaequalis =

Scientific classification
- Domain: Eukaryota
- Kingdom: Animalia
- Phylum: Arthropoda
- Class: Insecta
- Order: Coleoptera
- Suborder: Polyphaga
- Infraorder: Cucujiformia
- Family: Cerambycidae
- Genus: Aconodes
- Species: A. subaequalis

Binomial name
- Aconodes subaequalis (Aurivillius, 1922)

Synonyms
- Centrura subaequalis Aurivillius, 1922; Chambaganorum angustatum Pic, 1925

Species of beetle

Aconodes subaequalis is a species of beetle in the family Cerambycidae. It was described by Per Olof Christopher Aurivillius in 1922. It is known from India.
