= Pseudostixis basigranosa =

Scientific classification
- Kingdom: Animalia
- Phylum: Arthropoda
- Class: Insecta
- Order: Coleoptera
- Suborder: Polyphaga
- Infraorder: Cucujiformia
- Family: Cerambycidae
- Genus: Pseudostixis
- Species: P. basigranosa

Binomial name
- Pseudostixis basigranosa Breuning, 1945

Species of beetle

Pseudostixis basigranosa is a species of beetle in the family Cerambycidae. It was described by Stephan von Breuning in 1945.
