= Apomempsis similis =

Scientific classification
- Kingdom: Animalia
- Phylum: Arthropoda
- Class: Insecta
- Order: Coleoptera
- Suborder: Polyphaga
- Infraorder: Cucujiformia
- Family: Cerambycidae
- Genus: Apomempsis
- Species: A. similis

Binomial name
- Apomempsis similis Breuning, 1939

Species of beetle

Apomempsis similis is a species of beetle in the family Cerambycidae. It was described by Stephan von Breuning in 1939. It is known from Cameroon and the Central African Republic. Its type locality was only recorded as "Cameroon".

Apomempsis similis measure 9–11 mm (0.35–0.43 in) in length.
