= Morimopsis mussardi =

Scientific classification
- Kingdom: Animalia
- Phylum: Arthropoda
- Class: Insecta
- Order: Coleoptera
- Suborder: Polyphaga
- Infraorder: Cucujiformia
- Family: Cerambycidae
- Genus: Morimopsis
- Species: M. mussardi

Binomial name
- Morimopsis mussardi Breuning, 1965

Species of beetle

Morimopsis mussardi is a species of beetle in the family Cerambycidae. It was described by Stephan von Breuning in 1965.
