= Pseudostixis dentata =

Scientific classification
- Kingdom: Animalia
- Phylum: Arthropoda
- Class: Insecta
- Order: Coleoptera
- Suborder: Polyphaga
- Infraorder: Cucujiformia
- Family: Cerambycidae
- Genus: Pseudostixis
- Species: P. dentata

Binomial name
- Pseudostixis dentata (Hintz, 1911)

Species of beetle

Pseudostixis dentata is a species of beetle in the family Cerambycidae. It was described by Hintz in 1911.
