= Aconodes =

Scientific classification
- Domain: Eukaryota
- Kingdom: Animalia
- Phylum: Arthropoda
- Class: Insecta
- Order: Coleoptera
- Suborder: Polyphaga
- Infraorder: Cucujiformia
- Family: Cerambycidae
- Tribe: Morimopsini
- Genus: Aconodes; Pascoe, 1857

Synonyms
- Centrura Guérin-Méneville, 1843 (Homonym); Dioxippe Thomson, 1861; Chambaganarum Pic, 1925

Genus of beetles

Aconodes is a genus of longhorn beetles of the subfamily Lamiinae, containing the following species:

- Aconodes affinis (Breuning, 1940)
- Aconodes bilobatus (Breuning, 1939)
- Aconodes bulbosus Breuning, 1956
- Aconodes costatus (Guérin-Méneville, 1843)
- Aconodes euphorbiae Holzschuh, 2003
- Aconodes latefasciatus Holzschuh, 1984
- Aconodes lima Holzschuh, 1989
- Aconodes montanus Pascoe, 1857
- Aconodes multituberculatus (Breuning, 1947)
- Aconodes nepalensis Heyrovský, 1976
- Aconodes obliquatus (Breuning, 1939)
- Aconodes pedongensis Breuning, 1956
- Aconodes persimilis (Breuning, 1939)
- Aconodes piniphilus Holzschuh, 2003
- Aconodes sikkimensis (Breuning, 1940)
- Aconodes subaequalis (Aurivillius, 1922)
- Aconodes submontanus (Breuning, 1949)
- Aconodes truncatus (Breuning, 1939)
- Aconodes tuberculatus (Breuning, 1940)
