= Aconodes bilobatus =

Scientific classification
- Kingdom: Animalia
- Phylum: Arthropoda
- Class: Insecta
- Order: Coleoptera
- Suborder: Polyphaga
- Infraorder: Cucujiformia
- Family: Cerambycidae
- Genus: Aconodes
- Species: A. bilobatus

Binomial name
- Aconodes bilobatus (Breuning, 1939)

Synonyms
- Centrura bilobata Breuning, 1939

Species of beetle

Aconodes bilobatus is a species of beetle in the family Cerambycidae. It was described by Stephan von Breuning in 1939. It is known from India, Myanmar, and Tibet (China).

It is 8–10 mm (0.31–0.39 in) long and 2 1/3–2 3/4 mm (0.092–0.108 in) wide, and its type locality is Minutang, Mishmi Hills.
