= Pappus =

Pappus may refer to:

- Pappus (botany), a structure within certain flowers
- Pappus (bug), a genus of insects in the tribe Mirini
- Pappus of Alexandria, Greek mathematician
  - Pappus's hexagon theorem, often just called 'Pappus's theorem', a theorem named for Pappus of Alexandria
  - Pappus's centroid theorem, another theorem named for Pappus of Alexandria
  - Pappus configuration, a geometric configuration related to 'Pappus's theorem'
  - Pappus graph, a graph related to the pappus configuration

== See also ==
- Papus (disambiguation)
- Pappu, an Indian male given name
  - Pappu (cinematographer) (1977–2022), Indian cinematographer
- Pappu (film), 1980 Indian film
