= Monoxenus kenyensis =

Scientific classification
- Kingdom: Animalia
- Phylum: Arthropoda
- Class: Insecta
- Order: Coleoptera
- Suborder: Polyphaga
- Infraorder: Cucujiformia
- Family: Cerambycidae
- Genus: Monoxenus
- Species: M. kenyensis

Binomial name
- Monoxenus kenyensis Breuning, 1940

Species of beetle

Monoxenus kenyensis is a species of beetle in the family Cerambycidae. It was described by Stephan von Breuning in 1940.
