= Aconodes truncatus =

Scientific classification
- Kingdom: Animalia
- Phylum: Arthropoda
- Class: Insecta
- Order: Coleoptera
- Suborder: Polyphaga
- Infraorder: Cucujiformia
- Family: Cerambycidae
- Genus: Aconodes
- Species: A. truncatus

Binomial name
- Aconodes truncatus (Breuning, 1939)

Synonyms
- Centrura truncata Breuning, 1939

Species of beetle

Aconodes truncatus is a species of beetle belonging to the family of Cerambycidae. It was described by Stephan von Breuning in 1939. It is known from India.

It's 5–6 mm long and 1¾–2½ mm wide, and its type locality is Darjeeling.
