= Aconodes sikkimensis =

Scientific classification
- Kingdom: Animalia
- Phylum: Arthropoda
- Class: Insecta
- Order: Coleoptera
- Suborder: Polyphaga
- Infraorder: Cucujiformia
- Family: Cerambycidae
- Genus: Aconodes
- Species: A. sikkimensis

Binomial name
- Aconodes sikkimensis (Breuning, 1940)

Synonyms
- Centrura sikkimensis Breuning, 1940

Species of beetle

Aconodes sikkimensis is a species of beetle in the family Cerambycidae. It was described by Stephan von Breuning in 1940. It is known from India.
