= Monoxenus spinosus =

Scientific classification
- Kingdom: Animalia
- Phylum: Arthropoda
- Class: Insecta
- Order: Coleoptera
- Suborder: Polyphaga
- Infraorder: Cucujiformia
- Family: Cerambycidae
- Genus: Monoxenus
- Species: M. spinosus

Binomial name
- Monoxenus spinosus Breuning, 1939

Synonyms
- Monoxenus (Dityloderus) spinosus Breuning, 1939

Species of beetle

Monoxenus spinosus is a species of beetle in the family Cerambycidae. It was described by Stephan von Breuning in 1939.

It is 12 mm long and 5.5 mm wide, and its type locality is Magamba, Usambara Mountains.
