= Aconodes costatus =

Scientific classification
- Kingdom: Animalia
- Phylum: Arthropoda
- Clade: Pancrustacea
- Class: Insecta
- Order: Coleoptera
- Suborder: Polyphaga
- Infraorder: Cucujiformia
- Family: Cerambycidae
- Genus: Aconodes
- Species: A. costatus

Binomial name
- Aconodes costatus (Guérin-Méneville, 1843)

Synonyms
- Centrura costata Guérin-Méneville, 1843; Dioxippe costata (Guérin-Méneville, 1843)

Species of beetle

Aconodes costatus is a species of beetle in the family Cerambycidae. It was described by Félix Édouard Guérin-Méneville in 1843. It is known from India.
