= Falsotrachystola =

Scientific classification
- Kingdom: Animalia
- Phylum: Arthropoda
- Class: Insecta
- Order: Coleoptera
- Suborder: Polyphaga
- Infraorder: Cucujiformia
- Family: Cerambycidae
- Tribe: Morimopsini
- Genus: Falsotrachystola

Genus of beetles

Falsotrachystola is a genus of longhorn beetles of the subfamily Lamiinae, containing the following species:

- Falsotrachystola asidiformis (Pic, 1915)
- Falsotrachystola torquata Holzschuh, 2007
