= Apomempsis bufo =

Scientific classification
- Kingdom: Animalia
- Phylum: Arthropoda
- Class: Insecta
- Order: Coleoptera
- Suborder: Polyphaga
- Infraorder: Cucujiformia
- Family: Cerambycidae
- Genus: Apomempsis
- Species: A. bufo

Binomial name
- Apomempsis bufo (Chevrolat, 1855)

Synonyms
- Phrissoma bufo Chevrolat, 1855

Species of beetle

Apomempsis bufo is a species of beetle in the family Cerambycidae. It was described by Louis Alexandre Auguste Chevrolat in 1855. It is known from Nigeria and Gabon.

Apomempsis bufo measure 9–12 mm (0.35–0.47 in) in length.
