= Stenoparmena =

Scientific classification
- Kingdom: Animalia
- Phylum: Arthropoda
- Class: Insecta
- Order: Coleoptera
- Suborder: Polyphaga
- Infraorder: Cucujiformia
- Family: Cerambycidae
- Subfamily: Lamiinae
- Tribe: Morimopsini
- Genus: Stenoparmena; Thomson, 1864

Genus of beetles

Stenoparmena is a genus of longhorn beetles of the subfamily Lamiinae, containing the following species:

- Stenoparmena crinita Thomson, 1864
- Stenoparmena ferruginea Aurivillius, 1915
- Stenoparmena mussardi Breuning, 1971
- Stenoparmena nigra Breuning & Téocchi, 1983
