= Monoxenus strandi =

Scientific classification
- Kingdom: Animalia
- Phylum: Arthropoda
- Class: Insecta
- Order: Coleoptera
- Suborder: Polyphaga
- Infraorder: Cucujiformia
- Family: Cerambycidae
- Genus: Monoxenus
- Species: M. strandi

Binomial name
- Monoxenus strandi Breuning, 1939

Synonyms
- Monoxenus (Dityloderus) strandi Breuning, 1939

Species of beetle

Monoxenus strandi is a species of beetle in the family Cerambycidae. It was described by Stephan von Breuning in 1939.

It is 14 mm long and 6 mm wide, and its type locality is the "Cherangai Hills", Kenya. It was named in honor of Embrik Strand, in whose Festschrift the species description was written.
