= Monoxenus turrifer =

Scientific classification
- Kingdom: Animalia
- Phylum: Arthropoda
- Class: Insecta
- Order: Coleoptera
- Suborder: Polyphaga
- Infraorder: Cucujiformia
- Family: Cerambycidae
- Genus: Monoxenus
- Species: M. turrifer

Binomial name
- Monoxenus turrifer Aurivillius, 1914

Species of beetle

Monoxenus turrifer is a species of beetle in the family Cerambycidae. It was described by Per Olof Christopher Aurivillius in 1914.
