= Haploparmena angolana =

Scientific classification
- Domain: Eukaryota
- Kingdom: Animalia
- Phylum: Arthropoda
- Class: Insecta
- Order: Coleoptera
- Suborder: Polyphaga
- Infraorder: Cucujiformia
- Family: Cerambycidae
- Genus: Haploparmena
- Species: H. angolana

Binomial name
- Haploparmena angolana Aurivillius, 1913

Species of beetle

Haploparmena angolana is a species of beetle in the family Cerambycidae. It was described by Per Olof Christopher Aurivillius in 1913 and is known from Angola.
