= Echthistatodes subobscurus =

Scientific classification
- Kingdom: Animalia
- Phylum: Arthropoda
- Class: Insecta
- Order: Coleoptera
- Suborder: Polyphaga
- Infraorder: Cucujiformia
- Family: Cerambycidae
- Genus: Echthistatodes
- Species: E. subobscurus

Binomial name
- Echthistatodes subobscurus Holzschuh, 1993

Species of beetle

Echthistatodes subobscurus is a species of beetle in the family Cerambycidae. It was described by Holzschuh in 1993. It is known from China.
