= Monoxenus elevatus =

Scientific classification
- Kingdom: Animalia
- Phylum: Arthropoda
- Class: Insecta
- Order: Coleoptera
- Suborder: Polyphaga
- Infraorder: Cucujiformia
- Family: Cerambycidae
- Genus: Monoxenus
- Species: M. elevatus

Binomial name
- Monoxenus elevatus Aurivillius, 1926

Species of beetle

Monoxenus elevatus is a species of beetle in the family Cerambycidae. It was described by Per Olof Christopher Aurivillius in 1926 and is known from Uganda.
