= Sinodorcadion punctuscapum =

Scientific classification
- Kingdom: Animalia
- Phylum: Arthropoda
- Class: Insecta
- Order: Coleoptera
- Suborder: Polyphaga
- Infraorder: Cucujiformia
- Family: Cerambycidae
- Genus: Sinodorcadion
- Species: S. punctuscapum

Binomial name
- Sinodorcadion punctuscapum Xie, Shi & Wang, 2013

Species of beetle

Sinodorcadion punctuscapum is a species of beetle in the family Cerambycidae. It was described by Xie, Shi and Wang in 2013. It is known from China.
