= Morimolamia =

Scientific classification
- Kingdom: Animalia
- Phylum: Arthropoda
- Class: Insecta
- Order: Coleoptera
- Suborder: Polyphaga
- Infraorder: Cucujiformia
- Family: Cerambycidae
- Subfamily: Lamiinae
- Tribe: Morimopsini
- Genus: Morimolamia; Breuning, 1954
- Species: M. fruhstorferi

Binomial name
- Morimolamia fruhstorferi Breuning, 1954

Genus of beetles

Morimolamia fruhstorferi is a species of beetle in the family Cerambycidae, and the only species in the genus Morimolamia. It was described by Stephan von Breuning in 1954.
