= Protilema =

Scientific classification
- Domain: Eukaryota
- Kingdom: Animalia
- Phylum: Arthropoda
- Class: Insecta
- Order: Coleoptera
- Suborder: Polyphaga
- Infraorder: Cucujiformia
- Family: Cerambycidae
- Tribe: Morimopsini
- Genus: Protilema

Genus of beetles

Protilema is a genus of longhorn beetles of the subfamily Lamiinae, containing the following species:

- Protilema gigas Aurivillius, 1908
- Protilema granulosum Breuning, 1942
- Protilema humeridens Aurivillius, 1926
- Protilema montanum Kriesche, 1923
- Protilema papus Vitali & Menufandu, 2010
- Protilema rotundipenne Breuning, 1947
- Protilema strandi Breuning, 1940
