= Pseudobrimus =

Scientific classification
- Kingdom: Animalia
- Phylum: Arthropoda
- Class: Insecta
- Order: Coleoptera
- Suborder: Polyphaga
- Infraorder: Cucujiformia
- Family: Cerambycidae
- Subfamily: Lamiinae
- Tribe: Morimopsini
- Genus: Pseudobrimus; Breuning, 1936

Genus of beetles

Pseudobrimus is a genus of longhorn beetles of the subfamily Lamiinae, containing the following species:

- Pseudobrimus affinis Breuning, 1936
- Pseudobrimus congoanus Breuning, 1936
- Pseudobrimus fossulatus Breuning, 1970
- Pseudobrimus gabonicus Breuning, 1936
- Pseudobrimus griseomarmoratus Breuning, 1936
- Pseudobrimus griseosparsus Breuning, 1964
- Pseudobrimus latefasciatus Breuning, 1948
- Pseudobrimus nigrovittatus Breuning, 1959
