= Phrissomidius =

Scientific classification
- Kingdom: Animalia
- Phylum: Arthropoda
- Class: Insecta
- Order: Coleoptera
- Suborder: Polyphaga
- Infraorder: Cucujiformia
- Family: Cerambycidae
- Tribe: Morimopsini
- Genus: Phrissomidius; Breuning, 1939
- Species: P. guineensis

Binomial name
- Phrissomidius guineensis Breuning, 1939

Genus of beetles

Phrissomidius guineensis is a species of beetle in the family Cerambycidae, and the only species in the genus Phrissomidius. It was described by Stephan von Breuning in 1939.

It's 15–17 mm long and 5–5.5 mm wide, and its type locality is Sierra Leone.
