= Aconodes obliquatus =

Scientific classification
- Domain: Eukaryota
- Kingdom: Animalia
- Phylum: Arthropoda
- Class: Insecta
- Order: Coleoptera
- Suborder: Polyphaga
- Infraorder: Cucujiformia
- Family: Cerambycidae
- Genus: Aconodes
- Species: A. obliquatus

Binomial name
- Aconodes obliquatus (Breuning, 1939)

Synonyms
- Centrura obliquata Breuning, 1939

Species of beetle

Aconodes obliquatus is a species of beetle in the family Cerambycidae. It was described by Stephan von Breuning in 1939. It is known from Myanmar.

It is 8–9 mm long and 3–3¼ mm wide, and its type locality was listed as "Ruby Mines", Myanmar.
