= Dolichostyrax moultoni =

Scientific classification
- Kingdom: Animalia
- Phylum: Arthropoda
- Class: Insecta
- Order: Coleoptera
- Suborder: Polyphaga
- Infraorder: Cucujiformia
- Family: Cerambycidae
- Genus: Dolichostyrax
- Species: D. moultoni

Binomial name
- Dolichostyrax moultoni Aurivillius, 1911

Species of beetle

Dolichostyrax moultoni is a species of beetle in the family Cerambycidae. It was described by Per Olof Christopher Aurivillius in 1911. It is known from Borneo and Malaysia.
