= Monoxenus multispinosus =

Scientific classification
- Kingdom: Animalia
- Phylum: Arthropoda
- Class: Insecta
- Order: Coleoptera
- Suborder: Polyphaga
- Infraorder: Cucujiformia
- Family: Cerambycidae
- Genus: Monoxenus
- Species: M. multispinosus

Binomial name
- Monoxenus multispinosus Breuning, 1939

Synonyms
- Monoxenus (Dityloderus) multispinosus Breuning, 1939

Species of beetle

Monoxenus multispinosus is a species of beetle in the family Cerambycidae. It was described by Stephan von Breuning in 1939.

It's 7.5 mm long and 3 mm wide, and its type locality is Kabve, Kivu.
