= Aconodes submontanus =

Scientific classification
- Kingdom: Animalia
- Phylum: Arthropoda
- Class: Insecta
- Order: Coleoptera
- Suborder: Polyphaga
- Infraorder: Cucujiformia
- Family: Cerambycidae
- Genus: Aconodes
- Species: A. submontanus

Binomial name
- Aconodes submontanus (Breuning, 1949)

Synonyms
- Centrura submontana Breuning, 1949

Species of beetle

Aconodes submontanus is a species of beetle in the family Cerambycidae. It was described by Stephan von Breuning in 1949. It is known from Myanmar.
