= Dolichostyrax longipes =

Scientific classification
- Kingdom: Animalia
- Phylum: Arthropoda
- Class: Insecta
- Order: Coleoptera
- Suborder: Polyphaga
- Infraorder: Cucujiformia
- Family: Cerambycidae
- Genus: Dolichostyrax
- Species: D. longipes

Binomial name
- Dolichostyrax longipes Aurivillius, 1913

Species of beetle

Dolichostyrax longipes is a species of beetle in the family Cerambycidae. It was described by Per Olof Christopher Aurivillius in 1913 and is known from Borneo.
