= Dolichostyrax =

Scientific classification
- Kingdom: Animalia
- Phylum: Arthropoda
- Class: Insecta
- Order: Coleoptera
- Suborder: Polyphaga
- Infraorder: Cucujiformia
- Family: Cerambycidae
- Tribe: Morimopsini
- Genus: Dolichostyrax

Genus of beetles

Dolichostyrax is a genus of longhorn beetles of the subfamily Lamiinae, containing the following species:

- Dolichostyrax longipes Aurivillius, 1913
- Dolichostyrax moultoni Aurivillius, 1911
- Dolichostyrax tuberculatus Fisher, 1936
