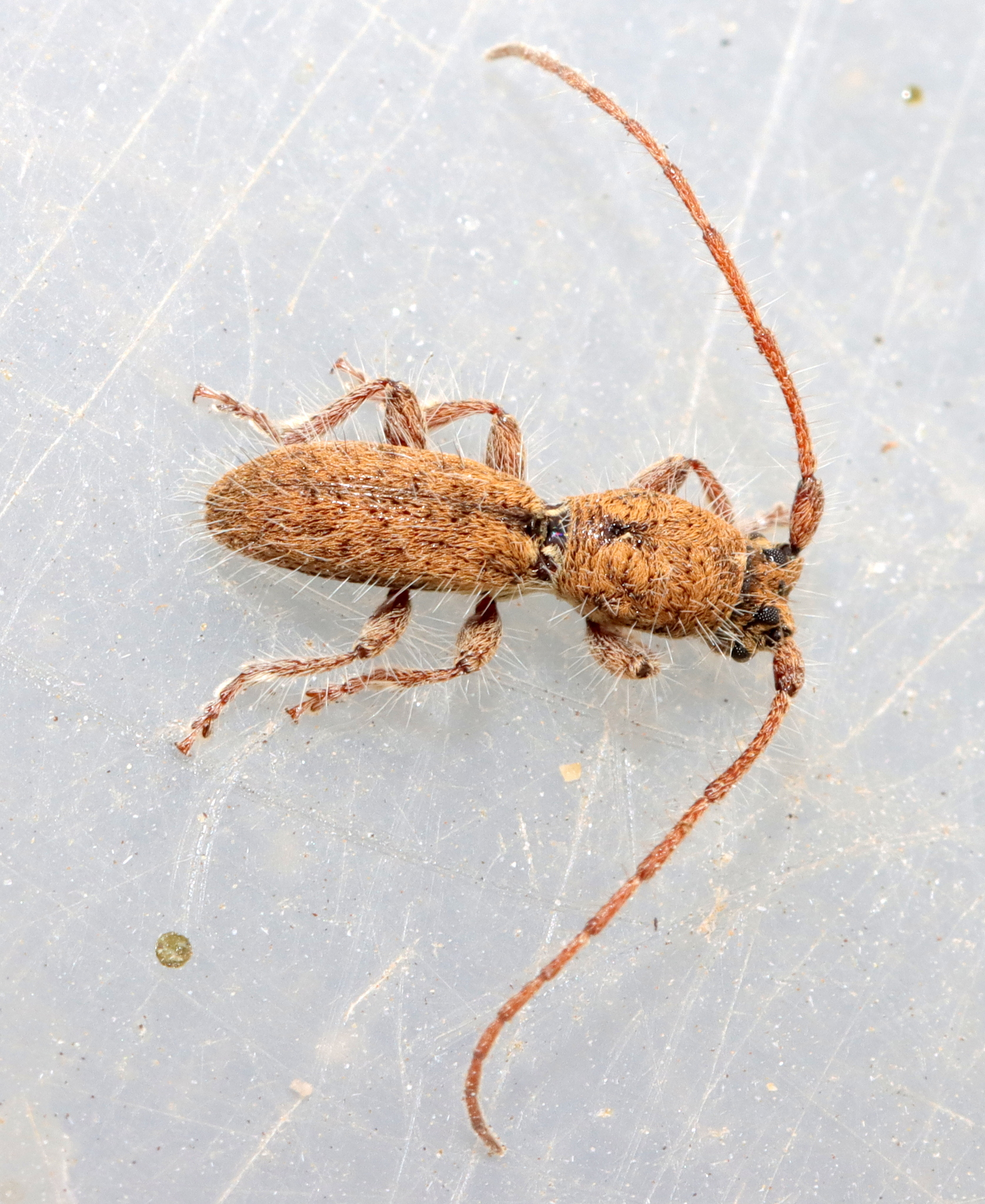

Scientific classification
- Kingdom: Animalia
- Phylum: Arthropoda
- Class: Insecta
- Order: Coleoptera
- Suborder: Polyphaga
- Infraorder: Cucujiformia
- Family: Cerambycidae
- Genus: Stenoparmena
- Species: S. crinita

Binomial name
- Stenoparmena crinita Thomson, 1864

= Stenoparmena crinita =

Species of beetle

Stenoparmena crinita is a species of beetle in the family Cerambycidae. It was described by James Thomson in 1864.
