= Monoxenus balteoides =

Scientific classification
- Kingdom: Animalia
- Phylum: Arthropoda
- Class: Insecta
- Order: Coleoptera
- Suborder: Polyphaga
- Infraorder: Cucujiformia
- Family: Cerambycidae
- Genus: Monoxenus
- Species: M. balteoides

Binomial name
- Monoxenus balteoides Breuning, 1939

Synonyms
- Monoxenus (Dityloderus) balteoides Breuning, 1939

Species of beetle

Monoxenus balteoides is a species of beetle in the family Cerambycidae. It was described by Stephan von Breuning in 1939.

It's 18 mm long and 7.5 mm wide, and its type locality is Kibosho, Kilimanjaro Region.
