= Monoxenus declivis =

Scientific classification
- Kingdom: Animalia
- Phylum: Arthropoda
- Class: Insecta
- Order: Coleoptera
- Suborder: Polyphaga
- Infraorder: Cucujiformia
- Family: Cerambycidae
- Genus: Monoxenus
- Species: M. declivis

Binomial name
- Monoxenus declivis Hintz, 1911

Species of beetle

Monoxenus declivis is a species of beetle in the family Cerambycidae. It was described by Hintz in 1911. It is known from Uganda.
