= Tuberolamia grilloides =

Scientific classification
- Kingdom: Animalia
- Phylum: Arthropoda
- Class: Insecta
- Order: Coleoptera
- Suborder: Polyphaga
- Infraorder: Cucujiformia
- Family: Cerambycidae
- Genus: Tuberolamia
- Species: T. grilloides

Binomial name
- Tuberolamia grilloides Touroult & Demez, 2012

Species of beetle

Tuberolamia grilloides is a species of beetle in the family Cerambycidae. It was described by Touroult and Demez in 2012.
