= Obages flavosticticus =

Scientific classification
- Kingdom: Animalia
- Phylum: Arthropoda
- Class: Insecta
- Order: Coleoptera
- Suborder: Polyphaga
- Infraorder: Cucujiformia
- Family: Cerambycidae
- Genus: Obages
- Species: O. flavosticticus

Binomial name
- Obages flavosticticus Breuning, 1939

Species of beetle

Obages flavosticticus is a species of beetle in the family Cerambycidae. It was described by Stephan von Breuning in 1939. It is known from Malaysia.

It's 8 mm long and 2.5 mm wide, and its type locality is Perak.
