= Microdorcadion tuberculatum =

Scientific classification
- Kingdom: Animalia
- Phylum: Arthropoda
- Class: Insecta
- Order: Coleoptera
- Suborder: Polyphaga
- Infraorder: Cucujiformia
- Family: Cerambycidae
- Genus: Microdorcadion
- Species: M. tuberculatum

Binomial name
- Microdorcadion tuberculatum Pic, 1925

Species of beetle

Microdorcadion tuberculatum is a species of beetle in the family Cerambycidae. It was described by Maurice Pic in 1925. It is known from Vietnam.
