= Morimonella =

Scientific classification
- Kingdom: Animalia
- Phylum: Arthropoda
- Class: Insecta
- Order: Coleoptera
- Suborder: Polyphaga
- Infraorder: Cucujiformia
- Family: Cerambycidae
- Tribe: Morimopsini
- Genus: Morimonella; Podaný, 1979
- Species: M. bednariki

Binomial name
- Morimonella bednariki Podaný, 1979

Genus of beetles

Morimonella bednariki is a species of beetle in the family Cerambycidae, and the only species in the genus Morimonella. It was described by Podaný in 1979.
