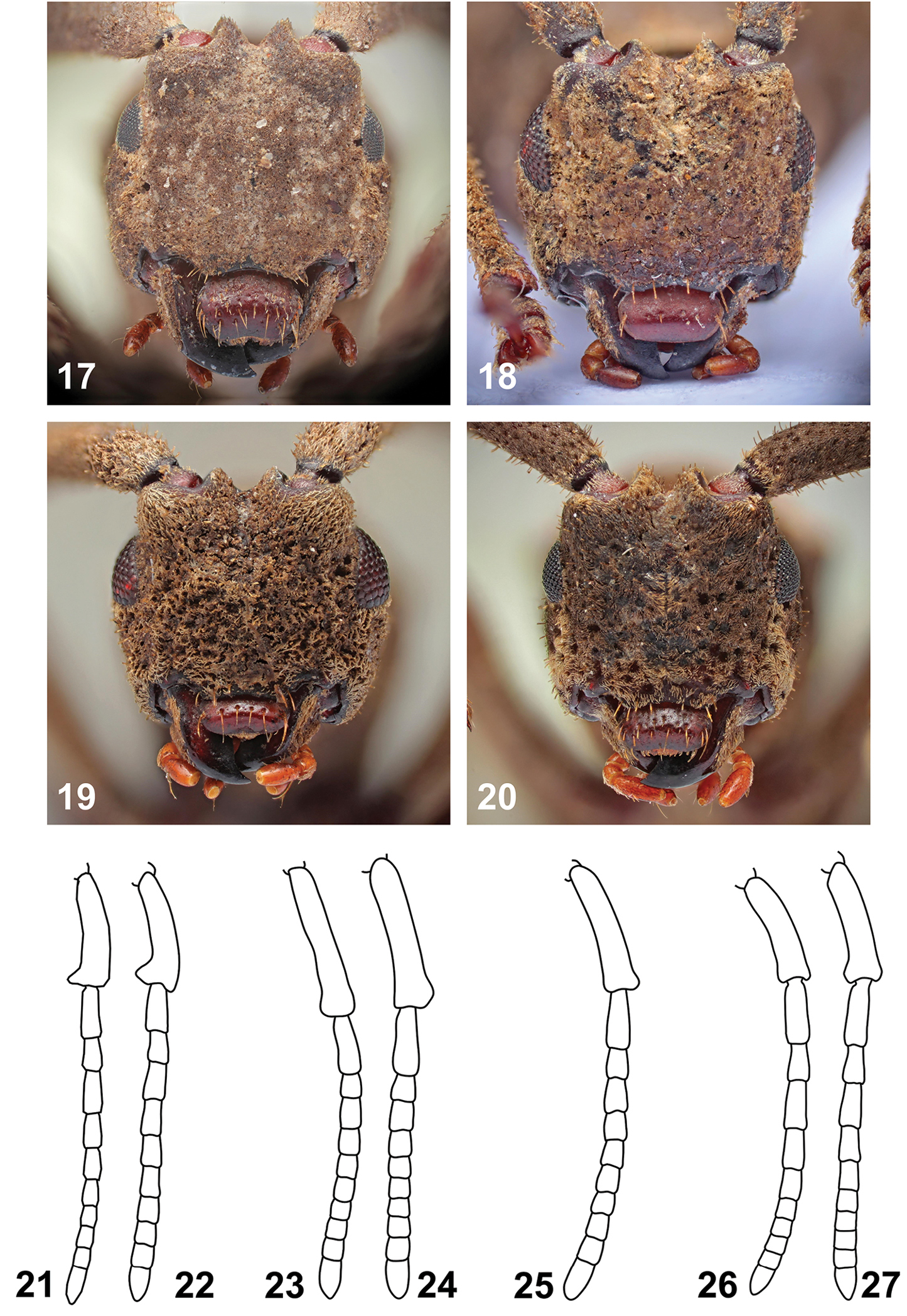

Scientific classification
- Kingdom: Animalia
- Phylum: Arthropoda
- Class: Insecta
- Order: Coleoptera
- Suborder: Polyphaga
- Infraorder: Cucujiformia
- Family: Cerambycidae
- Genus: Anexodus
- Species: A. sarawakensis

Binomial name
- Anexodus sarawakensis Sudre, 1997

= Anexodus sarawakensis =

Species of beetle

Anexodus sarawakensis is a species of beetle in the family Cerambycidae. It was described by Sudre in 1997. It is known from Borneo.
