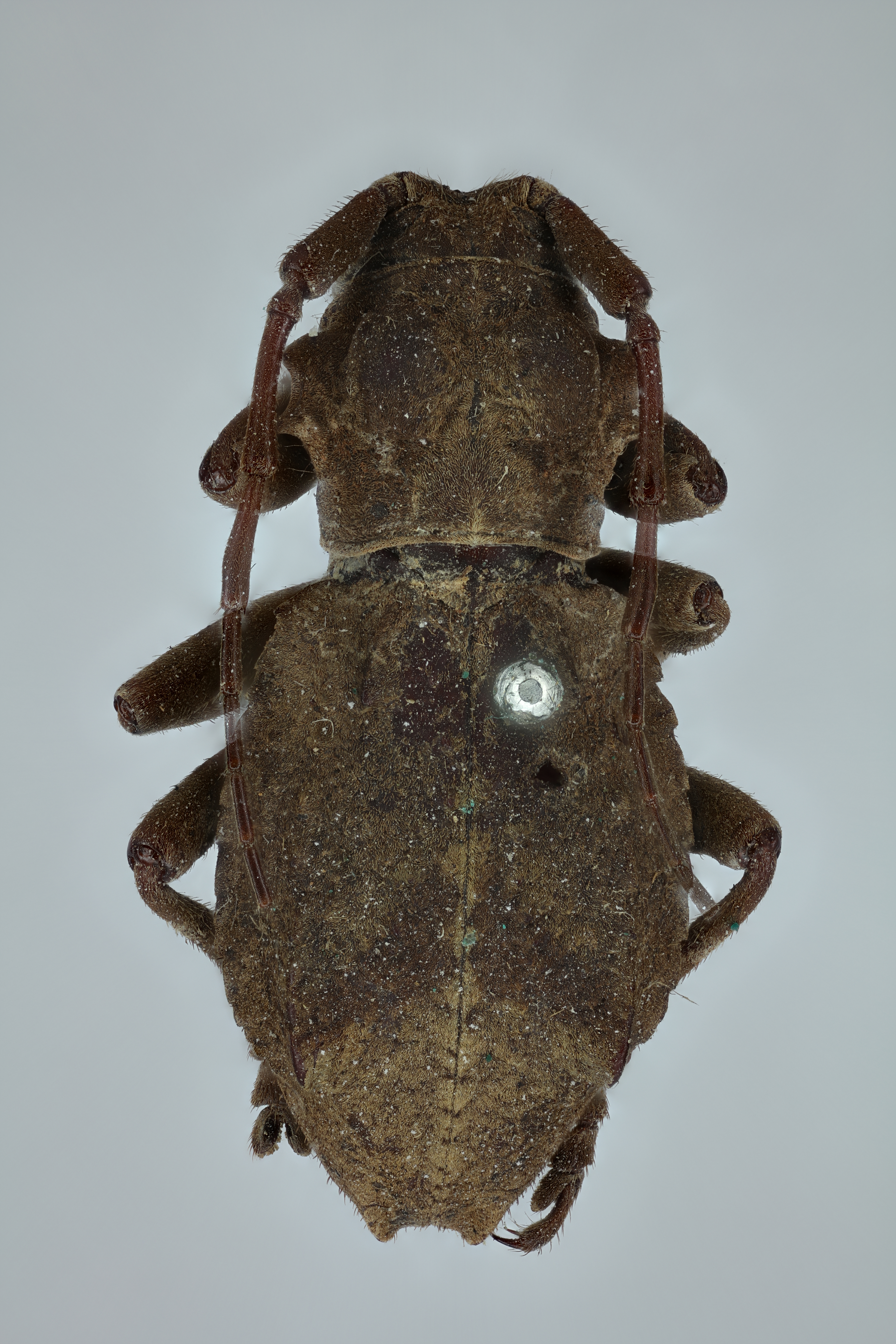

Scientific classification
- Kingdom: Animalia
- Phylum: Arthropoda
- Class: Insecta
- Order: Coleoptera
- Suborder: Polyphaga
- Infraorder: Cucujiformia
- Family: Cerambycidae
- Genus: Monoxenus
- Species: M. fuliginosus

Binomial name
- Monoxenus fuliginosus Gahan, 1898

= Monoxenus fuliginosus =

Species of beetle

Monoxenus fuliginosus is a species of beetle in the family Cerambycidae. It was described by Charles Joseph Gahan in 1898. It is known from Kenya. It feeds on Cupressus macrocarpa and Pinus radiata.
