= Pseudostixis flavomarmorata =

Scientific classification
- Kingdom: Animalia
- Phylum: Arthropoda
- Class: Insecta
- Order: Coleoptera
- Suborder: Polyphaga
- Infraorder: Cucujiformia
- Family: Cerambycidae
- Genus: Pseudostixis
- Species: P. flavomarmorata

Binomial name
- Pseudostixis flavomarmorata Breuning, 1964

Synonyms
- Pseudostixis flavomarmoratus Breuning, 1964 (misspelling)

Species of beetle

Pseudostixis flavomarmorata is a species of beetle in the family Cerambycidae. It was described by Stephan von Breuning in 1964, originally as Pseudostixis flavomarmoratus. It is known from the Democratic Republic of the Congo.
