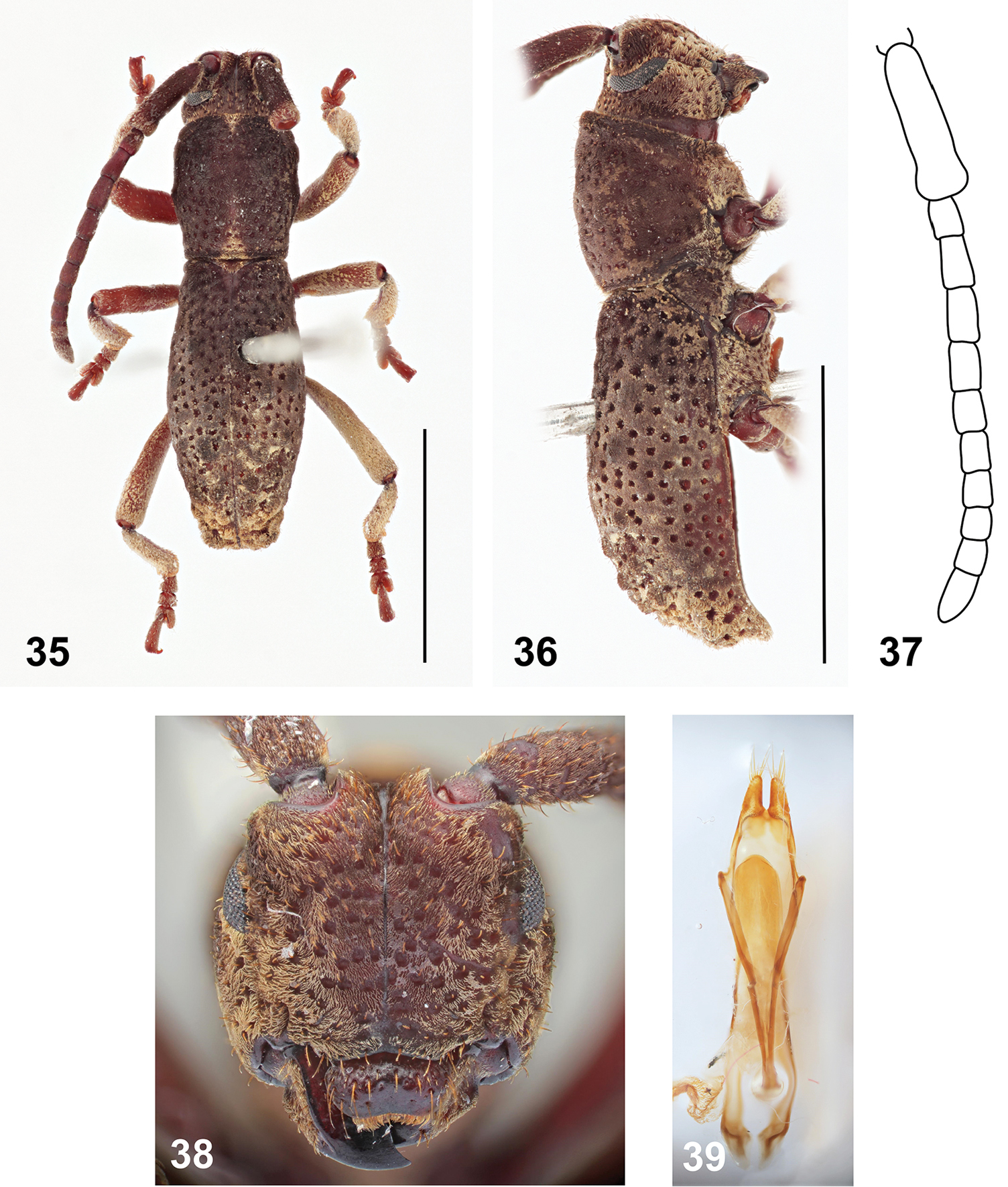

Scientific classification
- Kingdom: Animalia
- Phylum: Arthropoda
- Class: Insecta
- Order: Coleoptera
- Suborder: Polyphaga
- Infraorder: Cucujiformia
- Family: Cerambycidae
- Tribe: Morimopsini
- Genus: Pantilema; Aurivillius, 1911
- Species: P. angustum

Binomial name
- Pantilema angustum Aurivillius, 1911

= Pantilema =

Genus of beetles

Pantilema is a monotypic beetle genus in the family Cerambycidae described by Per Olof Christopher Aurivillius in 1911. Its single species, Pantilema angustum, was described by the same author in the same year.
