= Apomempsoides parva =

Scientific classification
- Domain: Eukaryota
- Kingdom: Animalia
- Phylum: Arthropoda
- Class: Insecta
- Order: Coleoptera
- Suborder: Polyphaga
- Infraorder: Cucujiformia
- Family: Cerambycidae
- Genus: Apomempsoides
- Species: A. parva

Binomial name
- Apomempsoides parva (Aurivillius, 1910)

Species of beetle

Apomempsoides parva is a species of beetle in the family Cerambycidae. It was described by Per Olof Christopher Aurivillius in 1910.
