= Monoxenus unispinosus =

Scientific classification
- Kingdom: Animalia
- Phylum: Arthropoda
- Class: Insecta
- Order: Coleoptera
- Suborder: Polyphaga
- Infraorder: Cucujiformia
- Family: Cerambycidae
- Genus: Monoxenus
- Species: M. unispinosus

Binomial name
- Monoxenus unispinosus Breuning, 1939

Synonyms
- Monoxenus (Dityloderus) unispinosus Breuning, 1939

Species of beetle

Monoxenus unispinosus is a species of beetle in the family Cerambycidae. It was described by Stephan von Breuning in 1939.

It is 11.5 mm long and 5 mm wide, and its type locality is Tanga, Tanzania.
