= Pseudostixis flavifrons =

Scientific classification
- Kingdom: Animalia
- Phylum: Arthropoda
- Class: Insecta
- Order: Coleoptera
- Suborder: Polyphaga
- Infraorder: Cucujiformia
- Family: Cerambycidae
- Genus: Pseudostixis
- Species: P. flavifrons

Binomial name
- Pseudostixis flavifrons (Aurivillis, 1914)

Synonyms
- Stixis flavifrons Aurivillis, 1914

Species of beetle

Pseudostixis flavifrons is a species of beetle in the family Cerambycidae. It was described by Aurivillis in 1914, originally under the genus Stixis.
