= Mycerinodes =

Scientific classification
- Kingdom: Animalia
- Phylum: Arthropoda
- Class: Insecta
- Order: Coleoptera
- Suborder: Polyphaga
- Infraorder: Cucujiformia
- Family: Cerambycidae
- Tribe: Morimopsini
- Genus: Mycerinodes

Genus of beetles

Mycerinodes is a genus of longhorn beetles of the subfamily Lamiinae, containing the following species:

- Mycerinodes lettowvorbecki Kriesche, 1926
- Mycerinodes puerilis Kolbe, 1894
- Mycerinodes uluguruensis Breuning, 1975
