= Tuberolamia =

Scientific classification
- Kingdom: Animalia
- Phylum: Arthropoda
- Class: Insecta
- Order: Coleoptera
- Suborder: Polyphaga
- Infraorder: Cucujiformia
- Family: Cerambycidae
- Tribe: Morimopsini
- Genus: Tuberolamia

Genus of beetles

Tuberolamia is a genus of longhorn beetles of the subfamily Lamiinae, containing the following species:

- Tuberolamia andicola Breuning, 1940
- Tuberolamia grilloides Touroult & Demez, 2012
