= Apomempsoides =

Scientific classification
- Kingdom: Animalia
- Phylum: Arthropoda
- Class: Insecta
- Order: Coleoptera
- Suborder: Polyphaga
- Infraorder: Cucujiformia
- Family: Cerambycidae
- Tribe: Morimopsini
- Genus: Apomempsoides; Breuning, 1950

Genus of beetles

Apomempsoides is a genus of longhorn beetles of the subfamily Lamiinae, containing the following species:

- Apomempsoides parva (Aurivillius, 1910)
- Apomempsoides trispinosa (Jordan, 1894)
