= Monoxenus flavescens =

Scientific classification
- Kingdom: Animalia
- Phylum: Arthropoda
- Class: Insecta
- Order: Coleoptera
- Suborder: Polyphaga
- Infraorder: Cucujiformia
- Family: Cerambycidae
- Genus: Monoxenus
- Species: M. flavescens

Binomial name
- Monoxenus flavescens Breuning, 1939

Synonyms
- Monoxenus (Dityloderus) flavescens Breuning, 1939

Species of beetle

Monoxenus flavescens is a species of beetle in the family Cerambycidae. It was described by Stephan von Breuning in 1939.

It is 11 mm long and 3.7 mm wide, and its type locality is Mount Kenya.
