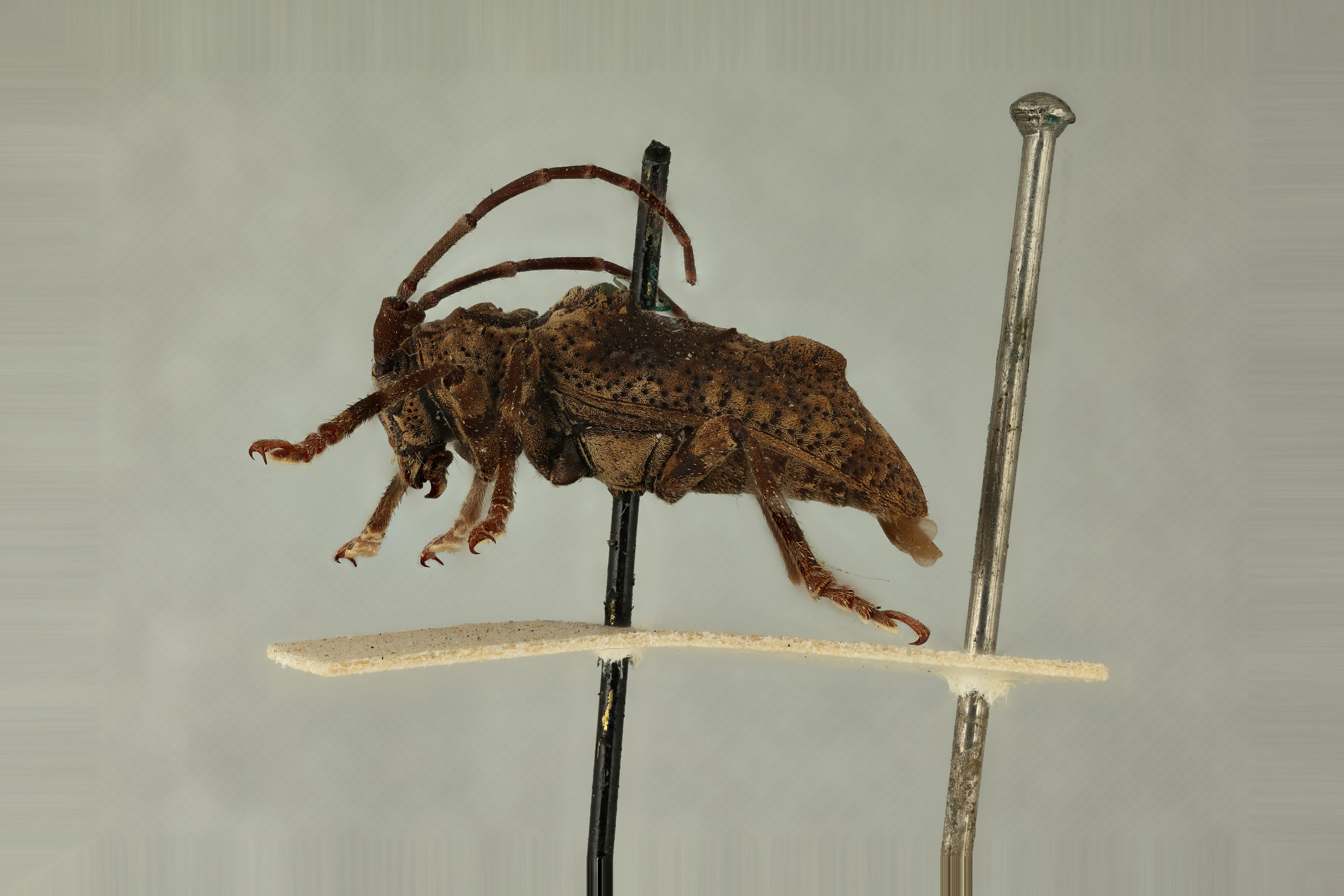

Scientific classification
- Kingdom: Animalia
- Phylum: Arthropoda
- Class: Insecta
- Order: Coleoptera
- Suborder: Polyphaga
- Infraorder: Cucujiformia
- Family: Cerambycidae
- Genus: Monoxenus
- Species: M. bicristatus

Binomial name
- Monoxenus bicristatus Breuning, 1939

= Monoxenus bicristatus =

Species of beetle

Monoxenus bicristatus is a species of beetle in the family Cerambycidae. It was described by Stephan von Breuning in 1939.

It's 10 mm long and 4 mm wide, and its type locality is Kumasi, Ghana.
