= Mycerinodes uluguruensis =

Scientific classification
- Kingdom: Animalia
- Phylum: Arthropoda
- Class: Insecta
- Order: Coleoptera
- Suborder: Polyphaga
- Infraorder: Cucujiformia
- Family: Cerambycidae
- Genus: Mycerinodes
- Species: M. uluguruensis

Binomial name
- Mycerinodes uluguruensis Breuning, 1975

Synonyms
- Mycerinodes ulugurensis Breuning, 1975

Species of beetle

Mycerinodes uluguruensis is a species of beetle in the family Cerambycidae. It was described by Stephan von Breuning in 1975. It is known from Tanzania.
