= Monoxenus bicarinatus =

Scientific classification
- Kingdom: Animalia
- Phylum: Arthropoda
- Class: Insecta
- Order: Coleoptera
- Suborder: Polyphaga
- Infraorder: Cucujiformia
- Family: Cerambycidae
- Genus: Monoxenus
- Species: M. bicarinatus

Binomial name
- Monoxenus bicarinatus Breuning, 1942

Synonyms
- Mimophrissoma livingstonei Sudre & Teocchi, 2001

Species of beetle

Monoxenus bicarinatus is a species of beetle in the family Cerambycidae. It was described by Stephan von Breuning in 1942. It is known from Malawi.
