= Echthistatodes brunneus =

Scientific classification
- Kingdom: Animalia
- Phylum: Arthropoda
- Class: Insecta
- Order: Coleoptera
- Suborder: Polyphaga
- Infraorder: Cucujiformia
- Family: Cerambycidae
- Genus: Echthistatodes
- Species: E. brunneus

Binomial name
- Echthistatodes brunneus Gressitt, 1938

Species of beetle

Echthistatodes brunneus is a species of beetle in the family Cerambycidae. It was described by Gressitt in 1938. It is known from China.
