= Pseudostixis =

Scientific classification
- Kingdom: Animalia
- Phylum: Arthropoda
- Class: Insecta
- Order: Coleoptera
- Suborder: Polyphaga
- Infraorder: Cucujiformia
- Family: Cerambycidae
- Tribe: Phrissomini
- Genus: Pseudostixis; Breuning, 1936

Synonyms
- Dolopharoides Breuning, 1978

Genus of beetles

Pseudostixis is a genus of longhorn beetles of the subfamily Lamiinae, containing the following species:

- Pseudostixis basigranosa Breuning, 1945
- Pseudostixis basilewskyi Breuning, 1960
- Pseudostixis densepunctata Breuning, 1936
- Pseudostixis dentata (Hintz, 1911)
- Pseudostixis flavifrons (Aurivillis, 1914)
- Pseudostixis flavomarmorata Breuning, 1964
- Pseudostixis griseostictica Breuning, 1936
- Pseudostixis integra Breuning
- Pseudostixis kivuensis Breuning, 1936
- Pseudostixis marshalli Breuning, 1936
- Pseudostixis proxima Breuning, 1936
- Pseudostixis vicina Breuning, 1936
