= Protilema humeridens =

Scientific classification
- Domain: Eukaryota
- Kingdom: Animalia
- Phylum: Arthropoda
- Class: Insecta
- Order: Coleoptera
- Suborder: Polyphaga
- Infraorder: Cucujiformia
- Family: Cerambycidae
- Genus: Protilema
- Species: P. humeridens

Binomial name
- Protilema humeridens Aurivillius, 1926

Species of beetle

Protilema humeridens is a species of beetle in the family Cerambycidae. It was described by Per Olof Christopher Aurivillius in 1926.
