= Monoxenus spinator =

Scientific classification
- Kingdom: Animalia
- Phylum: Arthropoda
- Class: Insecta
- Order: Coleoptera
- Suborder: Polyphaga
- Infraorder: Cucujiformia
- Family: Cerambycidae
- Genus: Monoxenus
- Species: M. spinator

Binomial name
- Monoxenus spinator Kolbe, 1893

Synonyms
- Monoxenus (Monoxenus) approximatus Breuning, 1939

Species of beetle

Monoxenus spinator is a species of beetle in the family Cerambycidae. It was described by Kolbe in 1893.

It's 10–10.5 mm long and 4.5–4.75 mm wide.
