= Sinodorcadion subspinicolle =

Scientific classification
- Kingdom: Animalia
- Phylum: Arthropoda
- Class: Insecta
- Order: Coleoptera
- Suborder: Polyphaga
- Infraorder: Cucujiformia
- Family: Cerambycidae
- Genus: Sinodorcadion
- Species: S. subspinicolle

Binomial name
- Sinodorcadion subspinicolle Breuning, 1959

Species of beetle

Sinodorcadion subspinicolle is a species of beetle in the family Cerambycidae. It was described by Stephan von Breuning in 1959. It is known from Malaysia.
