= Pseudhepomidion =

Scientific classification
- Kingdom: Animalia
- Phylum: Arthropoda
- Class: Insecta
- Order: Coleoptera
- Suborder: Polyphaga
- Infraorder: Cucujiformia
- Family: Cerambycidae
- Subfamily: Lamiinae
- Tribe: Morimopsini
- Genus: Pseudhepomidion; Breuning, 1936

Synonyms
- Morimopsidius Breuning, 1948

Genus of beetles

Pseudhepomidion is a genus of longhorn beetles of the subfamily Lamiinae.

== Species ==
- Pseudhepomidion albomaculatum Bi, 2020
- Pseudhepomidion assamense Breuning, 1936
- Pseudhepomidion longipenne Bi, 2020
- Pseudhepomidion triangulare (Breuning, 1948)
