= Mycerinodes puerilis =

Scientific classification
- Kingdom: Animalia
- Phylum: Arthropoda
- Class: Insecta
- Order: Coleoptera
- Suborder: Polyphaga
- Infraorder: Cucujiformia
- Family: Cerambycidae
- Genus: Mycerinodes
- Species: M. puerilis

Binomial name
- Mycerinodes puerilis Kolbe, 1894

Species of beetle

Mycerinodes puerilis is a species of beetle in the family Cerambycidae. It was described by Kolbe in 1894.
