= Aconodes montanus =

Scientific classification
- Domain: Eukaryota
- Kingdom: Animalia
- Phylum: Arthropoda
- Class: Insecta
- Order: Coleoptera
- Suborder: Polyphaga
- Infraorder: Cucujiformia
- Family: Cerambycidae
- Genus: Aconodes
- Species: A. montanus

Binomial name
- Aconodes montanus Pascoe, 1857

Synonyms
- Centrura montana (Pascoe, 1857)

Species of beetle

Aconodes montanus is a species of beetle in the family Cerambycidae. It was described by Francis Polkinghorne Pascoe in 1857. It is known from India and Nepal.
