= Sinodorcadion =

Scientific classification
- Kingdom: Animalia
- Phylum: Arthropoda
- Class: Insecta
- Order: Coleoptera
- Suborder: Polyphaga
- Infraorder: Cucujiformia
- Family: Cerambycidae
- Subfamily: Lamiinae
- Tribe: Morimopsini
- Genus: Sinodorcadion; Gressitt, 1939

Genus of beetles

Sinodorcadion is a genus of longhorn beetles of the subfamily Lamiinae, containing the following species:

- Sinodorcadion jiangi Xie, Shi & Wang, 2013
- Sinodorcadion magnispinicolle Xie, Shi & Wang, 2013
- Sinodorcadion punctulatum Gressitt, 1939
- Sinodorcadion punctuscapum Xie, Shi & Wang, 2013
- Sinodorcadion subspinicolle Breuning, 1959
