= Aconodes persimilis =

Scientific classification
- Domain: Eukaryota
- Kingdom: Animalia
- Phylum: Arthropoda
- Class: Insecta
- Order: Coleoptera
- Suborder: Polyphaga
- Infraorder: Cucujiformia
- Family: Cerambycidae
- Genus: Aconodes
- Species: A. persimilis

Binomial name
- Aconodes persimilis (Breuning, 1939)

Synonyms
- Centrura persimilis Breuning, 1939

Species of beetle

Aconodes persimilis is a species of beetle in the family Cerambycidae. It was described by Stephan von Breuning in 1939. It is known from India.

It is 10.5–12 mm long and 2.6–3 mm wide, and its type locality is the Nilgiri mountains.
