= Morimidius =

Scientific classification
- Kingdom: Animalia
- Phylum: Arthropoda
- Class: Insecta
- Order: Coleoptera
- Suborder: Polyphaga
- Infraorder: Cucujiformia
- Family: Cerambycidae
- Tribe: Morimopsini
- Genus: Morimidius; Breuning, 1939
- Species: M. flavosparsus

Binomial name
- Morimidius flavosparsus Breuning, 1939

Genus of beetles

Morimidius flavosparsus is a species of beetle in the family Cerambycidae, and the only species in the genus Morimidius. It was described by Stephan von Breuning in 1939.

It's 10.5–13 mm long and 3.5–5 mm wide, and its type locality is the Mishmi Hills, Assam.
