= Monoxenus lujae =

Scientific classification
- Kingdom: Animalia
- Phylum: Arthropoda
- Class: Insecta
- Order: Coleoptera
- Suborder: Polyphaga
- Infraorder: Cucujiformia
- Family: Cerambycidae
- Genus: Monoxenus
- Species: M. lujae

Binomial name
- Monoxenus lujae (Hintz, 1911)

Synonyms
- Dityloderus lujae Hintz, 1911

Species of beetle

Monoxenus lujae is a species of beetle in the family Cerambycidae. It was described by Hintz in 1911, originally under the genus Dityloderus.
