= Echthistatodes =

Scientific classification
- Kingdom: Animalia
- Phylum: Arthropoda
- Class: Insecta
- Order: Coleoptera
- Suborder: Polyphaga
- Infraorder: Cucujiformia
- Family: Cerambycidae
- Tribe: Morimopsini
- Genus: Echthistatodes

Genus of beetles

Echthistatodes is a genus of longhorn beetles of the subfamily Lamiinae, containing the following species:

- Echthistatodes brunneus Gressitt, 1938
- Echthistatodes subobscurus Holzschuh, 1993
