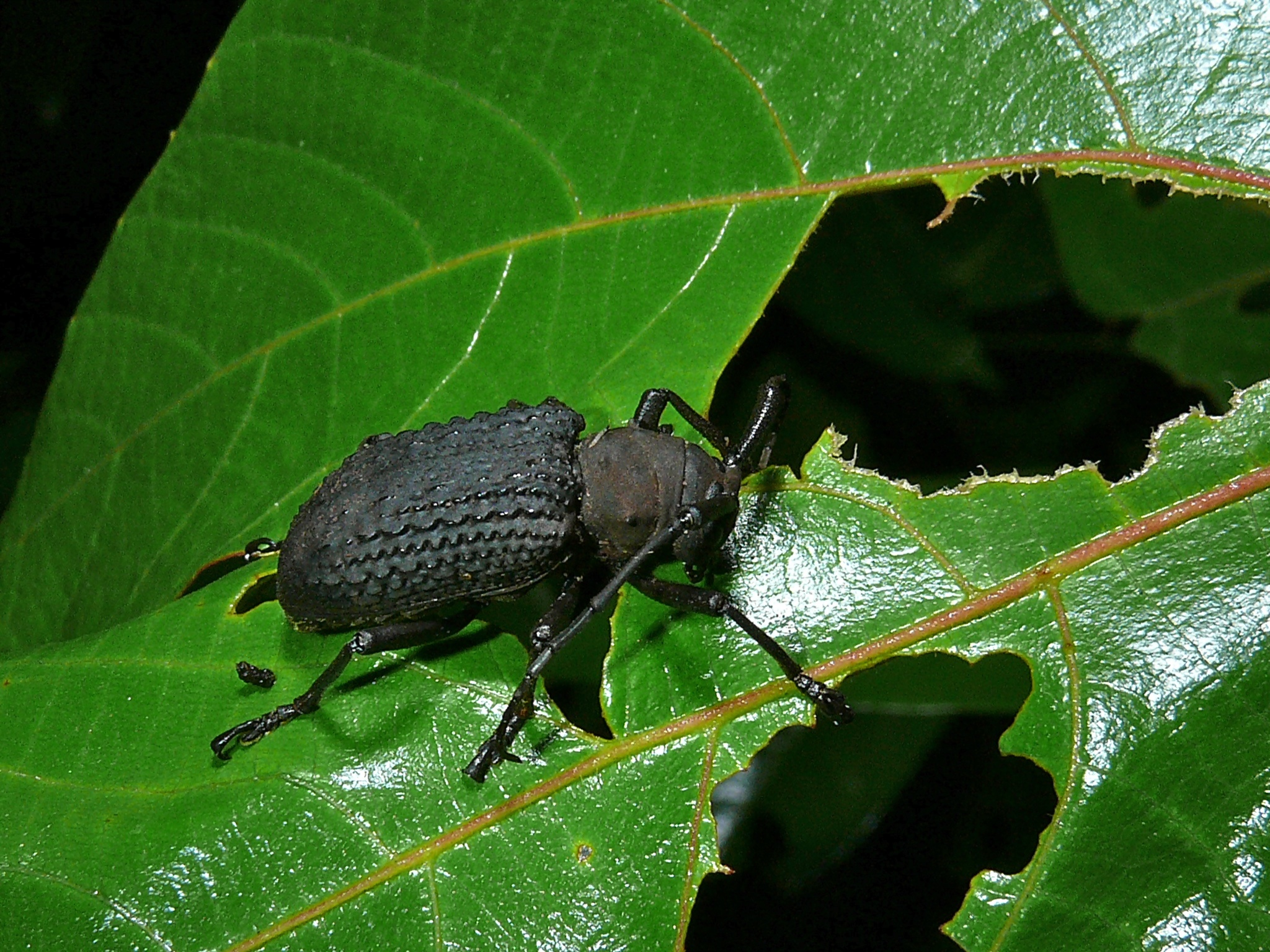

Scientific classification
- Kingdom: Animalia
- Phylum: Arthropoda
- Class: Insecta
- Order: Coleoptera
- Suborder: Polyphaga
- Infraorder: Cucujiformia
- Family: Cerambycidae
- Genus: Trachystola
- Species: T. granulata

Binomial name
- Trachystola granulata Pascoe, 1862

Synonyms
- Trachystola granulosa Pascoe, 1866

= Trachystola granulata =

Species of beetle

Trachystola granulata is a species of beetle in the family Cerambycidae. It was described by Francis Polkinghorne Pascoe in 1862. It is known from Malaysia, India, and Sumatra.
