= Monoxenus tridentatus =

Scientific classification
- Kingdom: Animalia
- Phylum: Arthropoda
- Class: Insecta
- Order: Coleoptera
- Suborder: Polyphaga
- Infraorder: Cucujiformia
- Family: Cerambycidae
- Genus: Monoxenus
- Species: M. tridentatus

Binomial name
- Monoxenus tridentatus (Aurivillius, 1903)

Synonyms
- Bothynoscelis tridentatus Aurivillius, 1903; Parapomempsoides camerunica Breuning, 1981

Species of beetle

Monoxenus tridentatus is a species of beetle in the family Cerambycidae. It was described by Per Olof Christopher Aurivillius in 1903 and is known from Cameroon.
