= Sinodorcadion magnispinicolle =

Scientific classification
- Kingdom: Animalia
- Phylum: Arthropoda
- Class: Insecta
- Order: Coleoptera
- Suborder: Polyphaga
- Infraorder: Cucujiformia
- Family: Cerambycidae
- Genus: Sinodorcadion
- Species: S. magnispinicolle

Binomial name
- Sinodorcadion magnispinicolle Xie, Shi & Wang, 2013

Species of beetle

Sinodorcadion magnispinicolle is a species of beetle in the family Cerambycidae. It was described by Xie, Shi and Wang in 2013. It is known from China.
