= Pseudostixis densepunctata =

Scientific classification
- Kingdom: Animalia
- Phylum: Arthropoda
- Class: Insecta
- Order: Coleoptera
- Suborder: Polyphaga
- Infraorder: Cucujiformia
- Family: Cerambycidae
- Genus: Pseudostixis
- Species: P. densepunctata

Binomial name
- Pseudostixis densepunctata Breuning, 1936

Species of beetle

Pseudostixis densepunctata is a species of beetle in the family Cerambycidae. It was described by Stephan von Breuning in 1936.
