= Mimodorcadion =

Scientific classification
- Kingdom: Animalia
- Phylum: Arthropoda
- Class: Insecta
- Order: Coleoptera
- Suborder: Polyphaga
- Infraorder: Cucujiformia
- Family: Cerambycidae
- Tribe: Morimopsini
- Genus: Mimodorcadion; Breuning, 1942
- Species: M. indicum

Binomial name
- Mimodorcadion indicum (Guérin-Méneville, 1844)

Genus of beetles

Mimodorcadion is a monotypic beetle genus in the family Cerambycidae described by Stephan von Breuning in 1942. Its only species, Mimodorcadion indicum, was described by Félix Édouard Guérin-Méneville in 1844.
