= Falsotrachystola torquata =

Scientific classification
- Kingdom: Animalia
- Phylum: Arthropoda
- Class: Insecta
- Order: Coleoptera
- Suborder: Polyphaga
- Infraorder: Cucujiformia
- Family: Cerambycidae
- Genus: Falsotrachystola
- Species: F. torquata

Binomial name
- Falsotrachystola torquata Holzschuh, 2007

Species of beetle

Falsotrachystola torquata is a species of beetle in the family Cerambycidae. It was described by Holzschuh in 2007.
