= Aconodes nepalensis =

Scientific classification
- Domain: Eukaryota
- Kingdom: Animalia
- Phylum: Arthropoda
- Class: Insecta
- Order: Coleoptera
- Suborder: Polyphaga
- Infraorder: Cucujiformia
- Family: Cerambycidae
- Genus: Aconodes
- Species: A. nepalensis

Binomial name
- Aconodes nepalensis Heyrovsky, 1976

Species of beetle

Aconodes nepalensis is a species of beetle in the family Cerambycidae. It was described by Leopold Heyrovský in 1976. It is known from Nepal.
