= Morimopsis lacrymans =

Scientific classification
- Domain: Eukaryota
- Kingdom: Animalia
- Phylum: Arthropoda
- Class: Insecta
- Order: Coleoptera
- Suborder: Polyphaga
- Infraorder: Cucujiformia
- Family: Cerambycidae
- Genus: Morimopsis
- Species: M. lacrymans

Binomial name
- Morimopsis lacrymans Thomson, 1857

Species of beetle

Morimopsis lacrymans is a species of beetle in the family Cerambycidae. It was described by James Thomson in 1857. It is known from India.
