= Monoxenus werneri =

Scientific classification
- Kingdom: Animalia
- Phylum: Arthropoda
- Class: Insecta
- Order: Coleoptera
- Suborder: Polyphaga
- Infraorder: Cucujiformia
- Family: Cerambycidae
- Genus: Monoxenus
- Species: M. werneri

Binomial name
- Monoxenus werneri Teocchi & al., 2010

Species of beetle

Monoxenus werneri is a species of beetle in the family Cerambycidae. It was described by Pierre Téocchi and al. in 2010. It is known from Tanzania.
