= Stenoparmena ferruginea =

Scientific classification
- Kingdom: Animalia
- Phylum: Arthropoda
- Class: Insecta
- Order: Coleoptera
- Suborder: Polyphaga
- Infraorder: Cucujiformia
- Family: Cerambycidae
- Genus: Stenoparmena
- Species: S. ferruginea

Binomial name
- Stenoparmena ferruginea Aurivillius, 1915

Species of beetle

Stenoparmena ferruginea is a species of beetle in the family Cerambycidae. It was described by Per Olof Christopher Aurivillius in 1915.
