= Apomempsis densepunctata =

Scientific classification
- Kingdom: Animalia
- Phylum: Arthropoda
- Class: Insecta
- Order: Coleoptera
- Suborder: Polyphaga
- Infraorder: Cucujiformia
- Family: Cerambycidae
- Genus: Apomempsis
- Species: A. densepunctata

Binomial name
- Apomempsis densepunctata Breuning, 1939

Species of beetle

Apomempsis densepunctata is a species of beetle in the family Cerambycidae. It was described by Stephan von Breuning in 1939. It is known from Gabon, the Democratic Republic of the Congo, and the Republic of the Congo. Its type locality is Arebi, Haut-Uele, DCR.

Apomempsis densepunctata measure 9–11 mm (0.35–0.43 in) in length.
