= Anerpa =

Scientific classification
- Domain: Eukaryota
- Kingdom: Animalia
- Phylum: Arthropoda
- Class: Insecta
- Order: Coleoptera
- Suborder: Polyphaga
- Infraorder: Cucujiformia
- Family: Cerambycidae
- Tribe: Morimopsini
- Genus: Anerpa; Gahan, 1907

Genus of beetles

Anerpa is a genus of longhorn beetles of the subfamily Lamiinae, containing the following species:

- Anerpa carinulata Gahan, 1907
- Anerpa steinkae Hüdepohl, 1990
