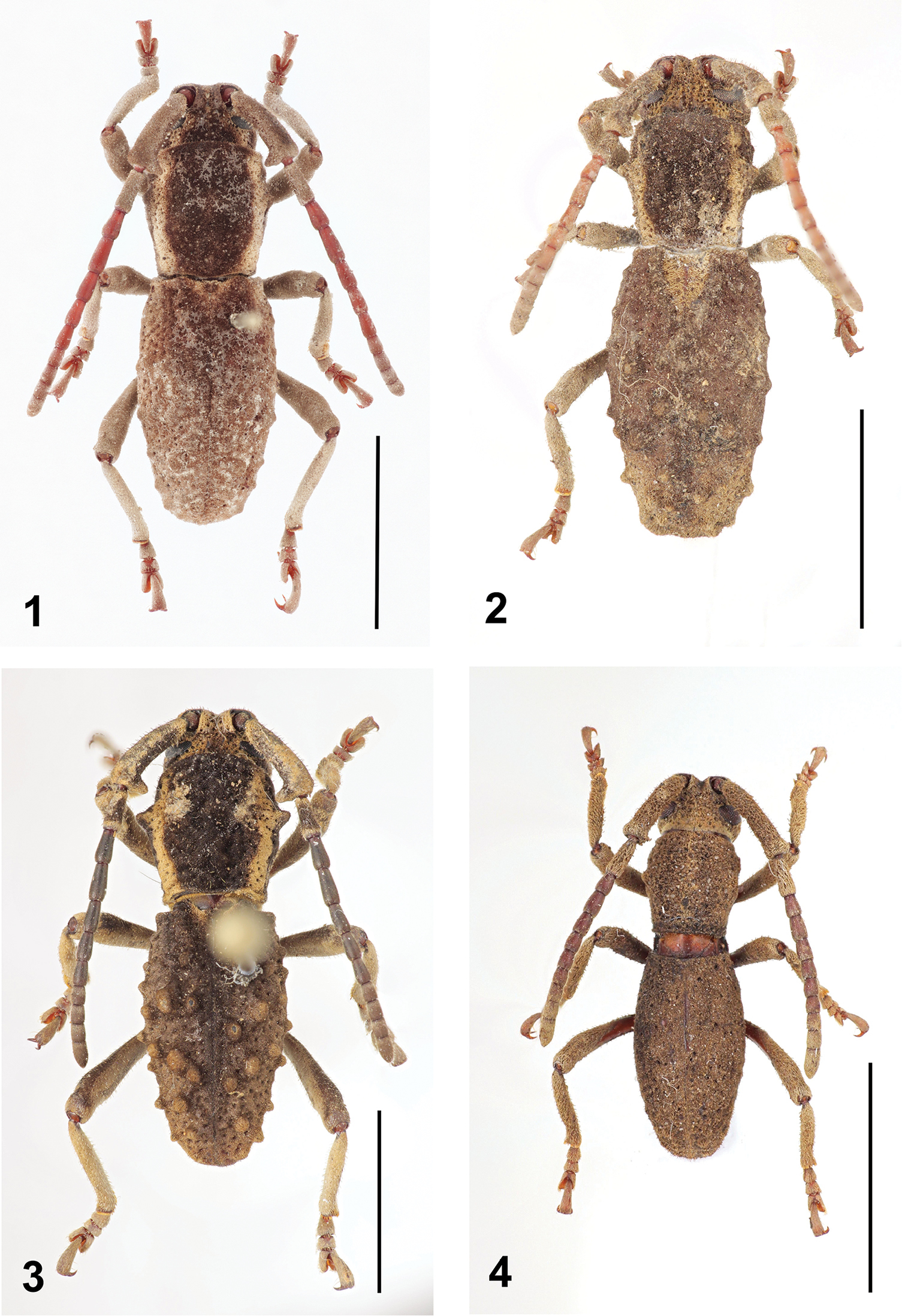

Scientific classification
- Domain: Eukaryota
- Kingdom: Animalia
- Phylum: Arthropoda
- Class: Insecta
- Order: Coleoptera
- Suborder: Polyphaga
- Infraorder: Cucujiformia
- Family: Cerambycidae
- Tribe: Morimopsini
- Genus: Anexodus; Pascoe, 1886

= Anexodus =

Genus of beetles

Anexodus is a genus of longhorn beetles of the subfamily Lamiinae, containing the following species:

- Anexodus aquilus Pascoe, 1886
- Anexodus sarawakensis Sudre, 1997
