= Protilema montanum =

Scientific classification
- Domain: Eukaryota
- Kingdom: Animalia
- Phylum: Arthropoda
- Class: Insecta
- Order: Coleoptera
- Suborder: Polyphaga
- Infraorder: Cucujiformia
- Family: Cerambycidae
- Genus: Protilema
- Species: P. montanum

Binomial name
- Protilema montanum Kriesche, 1923

Species of beetle

Protilema montanum is a species of beetle in the family Cerambycidae. It was described by Kriesche in 1923.
