= Bulbotrachystola =

Scientific classification
- Kingdom: Animalia
- Phylum: Arthropoda
- Class: Insecta
- Order: Coleoptera
- Suborder: Polyphaga
- Infraorder: Cucujiformia
- Family: Cerambycidae
- Tribe: Morimopsini
- Genus: Bulbotrachystola; Vitali & Yanega, 2019
- Species: B. bulbifera

Binomial name
- Bulbotrachystola bulbifera (Breuning, 1940)

Synonyms
- Centruroides bulbifera Breuning, 1940

Species of beetle

Bulbotrachystola is a genus of beetles in the family Cerambycidae, containing a single known species, Bulbotrachystola bulbifera. It was described by Stephan von Breuning in 1940.
