= Microdorcadion =

Scientific classification
- Kingdom: Animalia
- Phylum: Arthropoda
- Class: Insecta
- Order: Coleoptera
- Suborder: Polyphaga
- Infraorder: Cucujiformia
- Family: Cerambycidae
- Tribe: Morimopsini
- Genus: Microdorcadion

Genus of beetles

Microdorcadion is a genus of longhorn beetles of the subfamily Lamiinae, containing the following species:

- Microdorcadion laosense Breuning, 1950
- Microdorcadion tuberculatum Pic, 1925
