= Aconodes latefasciatus =

Scientific classification
- Domain: Eukaryota
- Kingdom: Animalia
- Phylum: Arthropoda
- Class: Insecta
- Order: Coleoptera
- Suborder: Polyphaga
- Infraorder: Cucujiformia
- Family: Cerambycidae
- Genus: Aconodes
- Species: A. latefasciatus

Binomial name
- Aconodes latefasciatus Holzschuh, 1984

Species of beetle

Aconodes latefasciatus is a species of beetle in the family Cerambycidae. It was described by Holzschuh in 1984. It is known from Nepal.
