= Aconodes euphorbiae =

Scientific classification
- Domain: Eukaryota
- Kingdom: Animalia
- Phylum: Arthropoda
- Class: Insecta
- Order: Coleoptera
- Suborder: Polyphaga
- Infraorder: Cucujiformia
- Family: Cerambycidae
- Genus: Aconodes
- Species: A. euphorbiae

Binomial name
- Aconodes euphorbiae Holzschuh, 2003

Species of beetle

Aconodes euphorbiae is a species of beetle in the family Cerambycidae. It was described by Holzschuh in 2003. It is known from Nepal.
