= Monoxenus horridus =

Scientific classification
- Kingdom: Animalia
- Phylum: Arthropoda
- Class: Insecta
- Order: Coleoptera
- Suborder: Polyphaga
- Infraorder: Cucujiformia
- Family: Cerambycidae
- Genus: Monoxenus
- Species: M. horridus

Binomial name
- Monoxenus horridus (Hintz, 1911)

Species of beetle

Monoxenus horridus is a species of beetle in the family Cerambycidae. It was described by Hintz in 1911.
