= Lamidorcadion =

Scientific classification
- Kingdom: Animalia
- Phylum: Arthropoda
- Class: Insecta
- Order: Coleoptera
- Suborder: Polyphaga
- Infraorder: Cucujiformia
- Family: Cerambycidae
- Tribe: Morimopsini
- Genus: Lamidorcadion; Pic, 1934

Synonyms
- Lamiodorcadion Breuning, 1961 (Missp.)

Genus of beetles

Lamidorcadion is a genus of longhorn beetles of the subfamily Lamiinae.

COL identifier: 637T3

== Species ==
- Lamidorcadion annulipes Pic, 1934
- Lamidorcadion laosense Breuning, 1968
- Lamidorcadion tuberosum Holzschuh, 1993
