= Obages cameroni =

Scientific classification
- Kingdom: Animalia
- Phylum: Arthropoda
- Class: Insecta
- Order: Coleoptera
- Suborder: Polyphaga
- Infraorder: Cucujiformia
- Family: Cerambycidae
- Genus: Obages
- Species: O. cameroni

Binomial name
- Obages cameroni Breuning, 1972

Species of beetle

Obages cameroni is a species of beetle in the family Cerambycidae. It was described by Stephan von Breuning in 1972. It is known from Malaysia.
