= Haploparmena =

Scientific classification
- Domain: Eukaryota
- Kingdom: Animalia
- Phylum: Arthropoda
- Class: Insecta
- Order: Coleoptera
- Suborder: Polyphaga
- Infraorder: Cucujiformia
- Family: Cerambycidae
- Tribe: Morimopsini
- Genus: Haploparmena

Genus of beetles

Haploparmena is a genus of longhorn beetles of the subfamily Lamiinae, containing the following species:

- Haploparmena angolana Aurivillius, 1913
- Haploparmena marmorata Breuning, 1940
