= Monoxenus aethiopicus =

Scientific classification
- Kingdom: Animalia
- Phylum: Arthropoda
- Class: Insecta
- Order: Coleoptera
- Suborder: Polyphaga
- Infraorder: Cucujiformia
- Family: Cerambycidae
- Genus: Monoxenus
- Species: M. aethiopicus

Binomial name
- Monoxenus aethiopicus (Müller, 1941)

Species of beetle

Monoxenus aethiopicus is a species of beetle in the family Cerambycidae. It was described by Müller in 1941.
