= Niphoparmenoides =

Scientific classification
- Kingdom: Animalia
- Phylum: Arthropoda
- Class: Insecta
- Order: Coleoptera
- Suborder: Polyphaga
- Infraorder: Cucujiformia
- Family: Cerambycidae
- Genus: Niphoparmenoides
- Species: N. tanganjicae

Binomial name
- Niphoparmenoides tanganjicae Breuning, 1978

Genus of beetles

Niphoparmenoides tanganjicae is a species of beetle in the family Cerambycidae, and the only species in the genus Niphoparmenoides. It was described by Stephan von Breuning in 1978.
