= Mimovelleda =

Scientific classification
- Kingdom: Animalia
- Phylum: Arthropoda
- Class: Insecta
- Order: Coleoptera
- Suborder: Polyphaga
- Infraorder: Cucujiformia
- Family: Cerambycidae
- Genus: Mimovelleda
- Species: M. umeridens

Binomial name
- Mimovelleda umeridens Breuning, 1940

Genus of beetles

Mimovelleda umeridens is a species of beetle in the family Cerambycidae, and the only species in the genus Mimovelleda. It was described by Stephan von Breuning in 1940.
