= Protilema papus =

Scientific classification
- Domain: Eukaryota
- Kingdom: Animalia
- Phylum: Arthropoda
- Class: Insecta
- Order: Coleoptera
- Suborder: Polyphaga
- Infraorder: Cucujiformia
- Family: Cerambycidae
- Genus: Protilema
- Species: P. papus

Binomial name
- Protilema papus Vitali & Menufandu, 2010

Species of beetle

Protilema papus is a species of beetle in the family Cerambycidae. It was described by Vitali and Menufandu in 2010. It is known from Indonesia.
