= Parmenolamia =

Scientific classification
- Kingdom: Animalia
- Phylum: Arthropoda
- Class: Insecta
- Order: Coleoptera
- Suborder: Polyphaga
- Infraorder: Cucujiformia
- Family: Cerambycidae
- Genus: Parmenolamia
- Species: P. unifasciata

Binomial name
- Parmenolamia unifasciata Breuning, 1950

Genus of beetles

Parmenolamia unifasciata is a species of beetle in the family Cerambycidae, and the only species in the genus Parmenolamia. It was described by Stephan von Breuning in 1950, from a specimen collected in Quang Tre Vietnam.

== Description ==
This beetle has hairy brown and white elytra.
