= Dorcadiopsis =

Scientific classification
- Kingdom: Animalia
- Phylum: Arthropoda
- Class: Insecta
- Order: Coleoptera
- Suborder: Polyphaga
- Infraorder: Cucujiformia
- Family: Cerambycidae
- Genus: Dorcadiopsis
- Species: D. planipennis

Binomial name
- Dorcadiopsis planipennis Müller, 1941

Genus of beetles

Dorcadiopsis planipennis is a species of beetle in the family Cerambycidae, and the only species in the genus Dorcadiopsis. It was described by Müller in 1941.
