= Caparmena =

Scientific classification
- Kingdom: Animalia
- Phylum: Arthropoda
- Class: Insecta
- Order: Coleoptera
- Suborder: Polyphaga
- Infraorder: Cucujiformia
- Family: Cerambycidae
- Genus: Caparmena
- Species: C. adlbaueri

Binomial name
- Caparmena adlbaueri Sudre & Téocchi, 2002

Genus of beetles

Caparmena adlbaueri is a species of beetle in the family Cerambycidae, and the only species in the genus Caparmena. It was described by Sudre and Téocchi in 2002.
