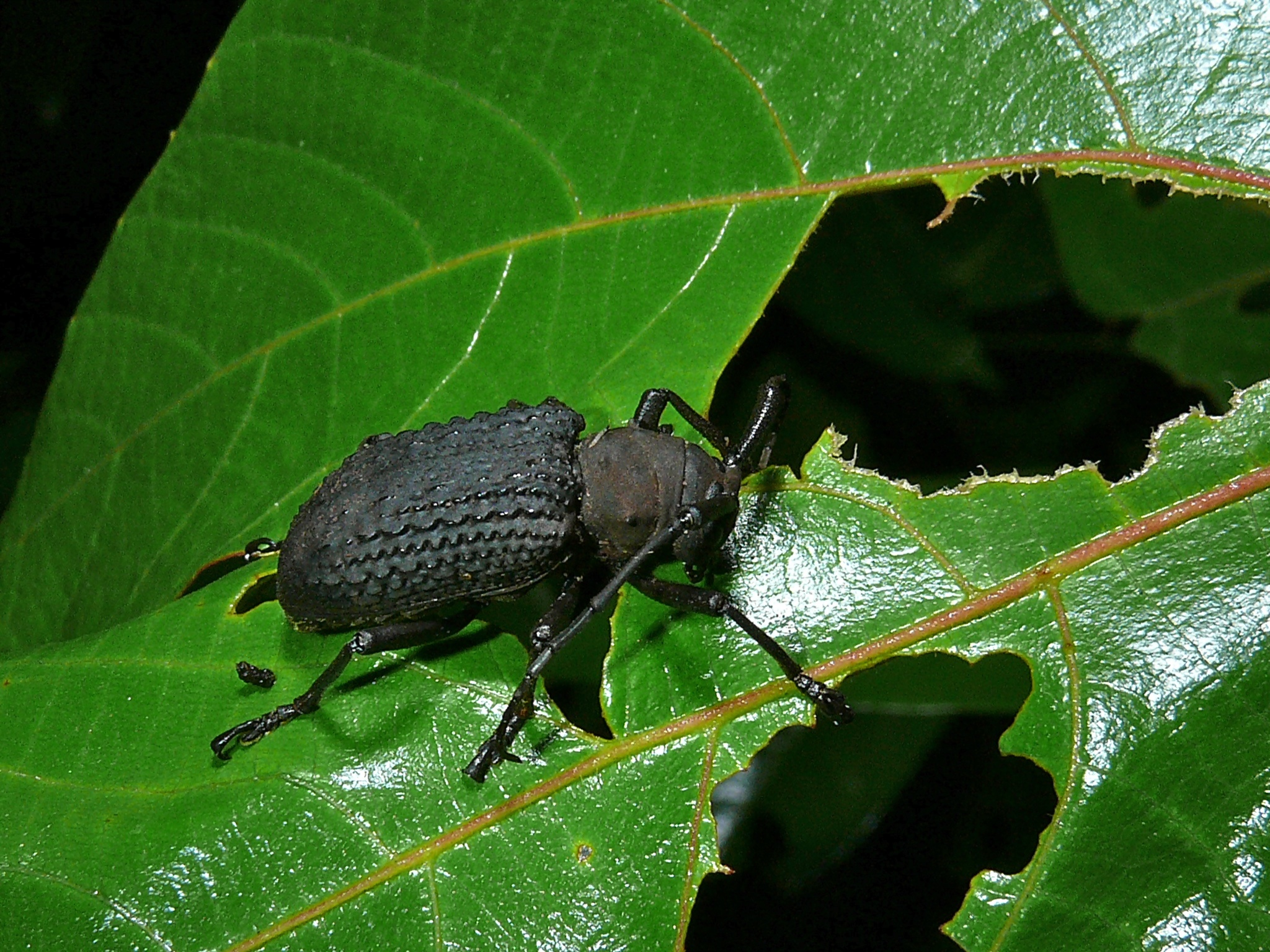
- Trachystola granulata

Scientific classification
- Kingdom: Animalia
- Phylum: Arthropoda
- Class: Insecta
- Order: Coleoptera
- Suborder: Polyphaga
- Infraorder: Cucujiformia
- Family: Cerambycidae
- Subfamily: Lamiinae
- Tribe: Lamiini
- Genus: Trachystola; Pascoe, 1862

= Trachystola =

Genus of beetles

Trachystola is a genus of longhorn beetles of the subfamily Lamiinae, containing the following species:

- Trachystola granulata Pascoe, 1862
- Trachystola scabripennis Pascoe, 1862
