= Paroriaethus =

Scientific classification
- Kingdom: Animalia
- Phylum: Arthropoda
- Class: Insecta
- Order: Coleoptera
- Suborder: Polyphaga
- Infraorder: Cucujiformia
- Family: Cerambycidae
- Genus: Paroriaethus
- Species: P. multispinis

Binomial name
- Paroriaethus multispinis Breuning, 1936

Genus of beetles

Paroriaethus multispinis is a species of beetle in the family Cerambycidae, and the only species in the genus Paroriaethus. It was described by Stephan von Breuning in 1936.
