= Opsies =

Scientific classification
- Kingdom: Animalia
- Phylum: Arthropoda
- Class: Insecta
- Order: Coleoptera
- Suborder: Polyphaga
- Infraorder: Cucujiformia
- Family: Cerambycidae
- Genus: Opsies
- Species: O. capra

Binomial name
- Opsies capra Pascoe, 1864

Genus of beetles

Opsies capra is a species of beetle in the family Cerambycidae, and the only species in the genus Opsies. It was described by Pascoe in 1864.
