= Somatovelleda =

Scientific classification
- Kingdom: Animalia
- Phylum: Arthropoda
- Class: Insecta
- Order: Coleoptera
- Suborder: Polyphaga
- Infraorder: Cucujiformia
- Family: Cerambycidae
- Genus: Somatovelleda
- Species: S. camerunica

Binomial name
- Somatovelleda camerunica Breuning, 1943

Genus of beetles

Somatovelleda camerunica is a species of beetle in the family Cerambycidae, and the only species in the genus Somatovelleda. It was described by Stephan von Breuning in 1943.
