= Paramonoxenus =

Scientific classification
- Domain: Bacteria
- Kingdom: Pseudomonadati
- Phylum: Bacteroidota
- Class: Flavobacteriia
- Order: Flavobacteriales
- Family: Weeksellaceae
- Genus: Paramonoxenus
- Species: P. tuberculatus

Binomial name
- Paramonoxenus tuberculatus Breuning, 1970

Genus of beetles

Paramonoxenus tuberculatus is a species of beetle in the family Cerambycidae, and the only species in the genus Paramonoxenus. It was described by Stephan von Breuning in 1970.
