= Protilemoides =

Scientific classification
- Kingdom: Animalia
- Phylum: Arthropoda
- Class: Insecta
- Order: Coleoptera
- Suborder: Polyphaga
- Infraorder: Cucujiformia
- Family: Cerambycidae
- Genus: Protilemoides
- Species: P. buergersi

Binomial name
- Protilemoides buergersi Kriesche, 1923

Genus of beetles

Protilemoides buergersi is a species of beetle in the family Cerambycidae, and the only species in the genus Protilemoides. It was described by Kriesche in 1923.
