= Lepromoris =

Scientific classification
- Kingdom: Animalia
- Phylum: Arthropoda
- Class: Insecta
- Order: Coleoptera
- Suborder: Polyphaga
- Infraorder: Cucujiformia
- Family: Cerambycidae
- Genus: Lepromoris
- Species: L. gibba

Binomial name
- Lepromoris gibba (Brullé, 1838)

Genus of beetles

Lepromoris gibba is a species of beetle in the family Cerambycidae, and the only species in the genus Lepromoris. It was described by Brullé in 1838.
