= Pseudomonoxenus =

Scientific classification
- Kingdom: Animalia
- Phylum: Arthropoda
- Class: Insecta
- Order: Coleoptera
- Suborder: Polyphaga
- Infraorder: Cucujiformia
- Family: Cerambycidae
- Genus: Pseudomonoxenus
- Species: P. crossotoides

Binomial name
- Pseudomonoxenus crossotoides Breuning, 1958

Genus of beetles

Pseudomonoxenus crossotoides is a species of beetle in the family Cerambycidae, and the only species in the genus Pseudomonoxenus. It was described by Stephan von Breuning in 1958.
