= Parobages =

Scientific classification
- Kingdom: Animalia
- Phylum: Arthropoda
- Class: Insecta
- Order: Coleoptera
- Suborder: Polyphaga
- Infraorder: Cucujiformia
- Family: Cerambycidae
- Genus: Parobages; Breuning, 1940
- Species: P. strandi

Binomial name
- Parobages strandi Breuning, 1940

Genus of beetles

Parobages strandi is a species of beetle in the family Cerambycidae, and the only species in the genus Parobages. It was described by Stephan von Breuning in 1940.
