= Kenyavelleda =

Scientific classification
- Kingdom: Animalia
- Phylum: Arthropoda
- Class: Insecta
- Order: Coleoptera
- Suborder: Polyphaga
- Infraorder: Cucujiformia
- Family: Cerambycidae
- Genus: Kenyavelleda
- Species: K. jirouxi

Binomial name
- Kenyavelleda jirouxi Téocchi, 1999

Genus of beetles

Kenyavelleda jirouxi is a species of beetle in the family Cerambycidae, and the only species in the genus Kenyavelleda. It was described by Téocchi in 1999.
