= Pirulintia =

Scientific classification
- Kingdom: Animalia
- Phylum: Arthropoda
- Class: Insecta
- Order: Coleoptera
- Suborder: Polyphaga
- Infraorder: Cucujiformia
- Family: Cerambycidae
- Genus: Pirulintia
- Species: P. angelinae

Binomial name
- Pirulintia angelinae Simonetta & Teocchi, 1995

Genus of beetles

Pirulintia angelinae is a species of beetle in the family Cerambycidae, and the only species in the genus Pirulintia. It was described by Simonetta and Teocchi in 1995.
