= Centruropsis =

Scientific classification
- Kingdom: Animalia
- Phylum: Arthropoda
- Class: Insecta
- Order: Coleoptera
- Suborder: Polyphaga
- Infraorder: Cucujiformia
- Family: Cerambycidae
- Genus: Centruropsis
- Species: C. dorcadionoides

Binomial name
- Centruropsis dorcadionoides (Pic, 1928)

Genus of beetles

Centruropsis dorcadionoides is a species of beetle in the family Cerambycidae, and the only species in the genus Centruropsis. It was described by Pic in 1928.
