= Apomempsis =

Scientific classification
- Domain: Eukaryota
- Kingdom: Animalia
- Phylum: Arthropoda
- Class: Insecta
- Order: Coleoptera
- Suborder: Polyphaga
- Infraorder: Cucujiformia
- Family: Cerambycidae
- Tribe: Morimopsini
- Genus: Apomempsis; Pascoe, 1864

Genus of beetles

Apomempsis is a genus of longhorn beetles of the subfamily Lamiinae, containing the following species:

- Apomempsis bufo (Chevrolat, 1855)
- Apomempsis densepunctata Breuning, 1939
- Apomempsis similis Breuning, 1939
