= Phantasis stupida =

Scientific classification
- Domain: Eukaryota
- Kingdom: Animalia
- Phylum: Arthropoda
- Class: Insecta
- Order: Coleoptera
- Suborder: Polyphaga
- Infraorder: Cucujiformia
- Family: Cerambycidae
- Subfamily: Lamiinae
- Tribe: Phantasini
- Genus: Phantasis
- Species: P. stupida

Binomial name
- Phantasis stupida Kolbe, 1894

Species of beetle

Phantasis stupida is a species of beetle in the family Cerambycidae. It was described by Hermann Julius Kolbe in 1894. It is known from Tanzania and Sudan.
