= Phantasis gigantea =

Scientific classification
- Kingdom: Animalia
- Phylum: Arthropoda
- Clade: Pancrustacea
- Class: Insecta
- Order: Coleoptera
- Suborder: Polyphaga
- Infraorder: Cucujiformia
- Family: Cerambycidae
- Subfamily: Lamiinae
- Tribe: Phantasini
- Genus: Phantasis
- Species: P. gigantea

Binomial name
- Phantasis gigantea (Guérin-Méneville, 1844)

Synonyms
- Phantasis meridionalis Hintz, 1906; Phantasis occidentalis Lansberge, 1877; Phantasis proserpina Thomson, 1867; Phantasis spectrum Thomson, 1865; Phantasis terribilis Thomson, 1860; Phanthasis mystica Distant, 1904; Phrissoma gigantea Guérin-Méneville, 1844; Phrissoma retrospinosum Harold, 1879

Species of beetle

Phantasis gigantea is a species of beetle in the family Cerambycidae. It was described by Félix Édouard Guérin-Méneville in 1844, originally under the genus Phrissoma.

Phantasis gigantea is found in Sub-Saharan Africa.
