= Phantasis nodulosa =

Scientific classification
- Domain: Eukaryota
- Kingdom: Animalia
- Phylum: Arthropoda
- Class: Insecta
- Order: Coleoptera
- Suborder: Polyphaga
- Infraorder: Cucujiformia
- Family: Cerambycidae
- Subfamily: Lamiinae
- Tribe: Phantasini
- Genus: Phantasis
- Species: P. nodulosa

Binomial name
- Phantasis nodulosa Sudre & Teocchi, 2000

Species of beetle

Phantasis nodulosa is a species of beetle in the family Cerambycidae. Phantasis nodulosa is found in Sub-Saharan Africa.
