= Phantasis tenebricosa =

Scientific classification
- Domain: Eukaryota
- Kingdom: Animalia
- Phylum: Arthropoda
- Class: Insecta
- Order: Coleoptera
- Suborder: Polyphaga
- Infraorder: Cucujiformia
- Family: Cerambycidae
- Subfamily: Lamiinae
- Tribe: Phantasini
- Genus: Phantasis
- Species: P. tenebricosa

Binomial name
- Phantasis tenebricosa Sudre & Teocchi, 2000

Species of beetle

Phantasis tenebricosa is a species of beetle in the family Cerambycidae. It was described by Jérôme Sudre and Pierre Téocchi.
