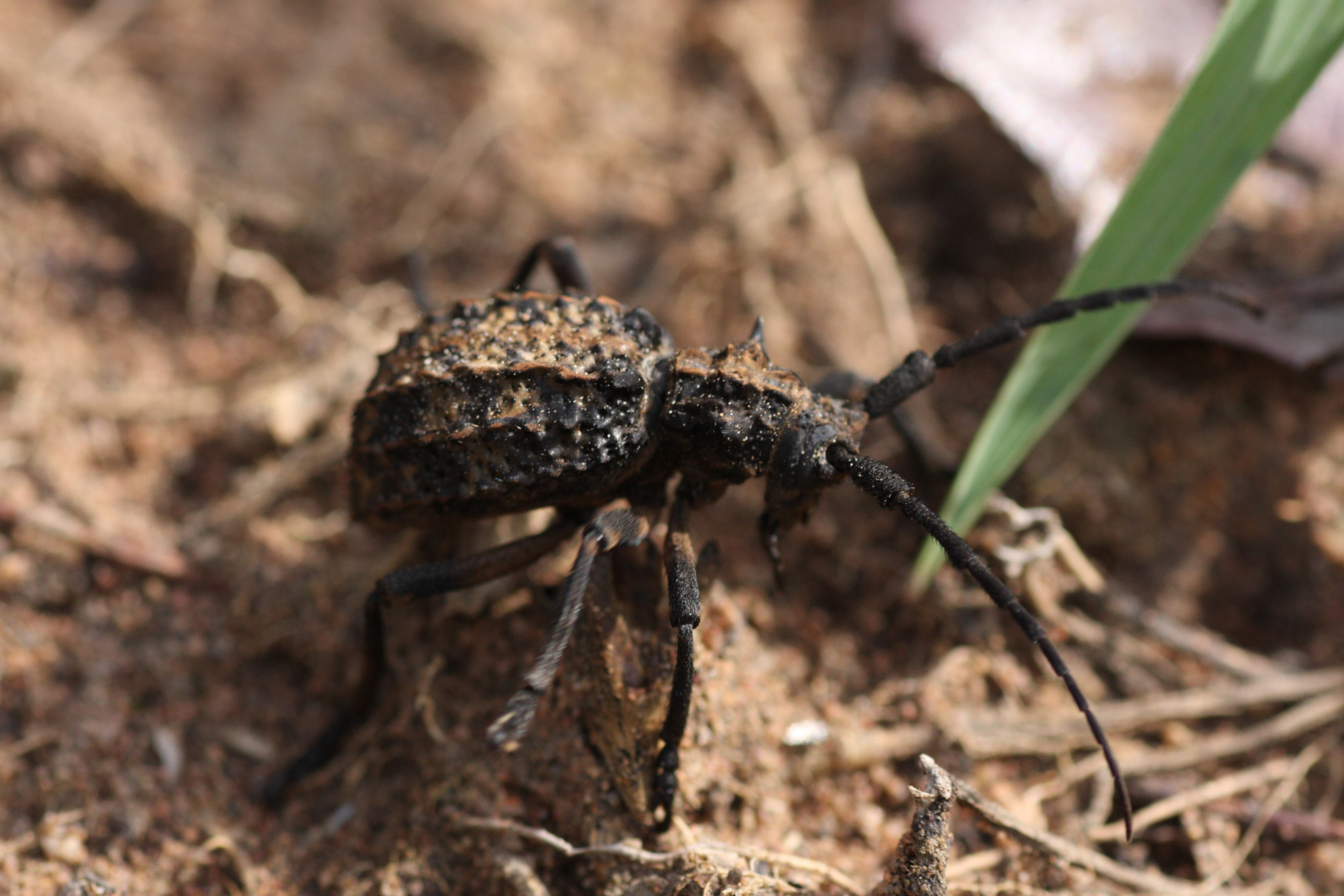
- Phantasis avernica, Zambia

Scientific classification
- Kingdom: Animalia
- Phylum: Arthropoda
- Class: Insecta
- Order: Coleoptera
- Suborder: Polyphaga
- Infraorder: Cucujiformia
- Family: Cerambycidae
- Subfamily: Lamiinae
- Tribe: Phantasini
- Genus: Phantasis
- Species: P. avernica

Binomial name
- Phantasis avernica Thomson, 1865

= Phantasis avernica =

Species of beetle

Phantasis avernica is a species of beetle in the family Cerambycidae. It was described by James Thomson in 1865. It has a wide distribution in Sub-Saharan Africa.

== Subspecies ==
These two subspecies belong to the species Phantasis avernica:

- Phantasis avernica avernica
- Phantasis avernica sansibarica (Harold, 1878) (Kenya, Tanzanie, Somalie)
