= Phantasis ardoini =

Scientific classification
- Kingdom: Animalia
- Phylum: Arthropoda
- Class: Insecta
- Order: Coleoptera
- Suborder: Polyphaga
- Infraorder: Cucujiformia
- Family: Cerambycidae
- Subfamily: Lamiinae
- Tribe: Phantasini
- Genus: Phantasis
- Species: P. ardoini

Binomial name
- Phantasis ardoini Breuning, 1967

Species of beetle

Phantasis ardoini is a species of beetle in the family Cerambycidae. It was described by Stephan von Breuning in 1967. It is known from Namibia and Angola./
