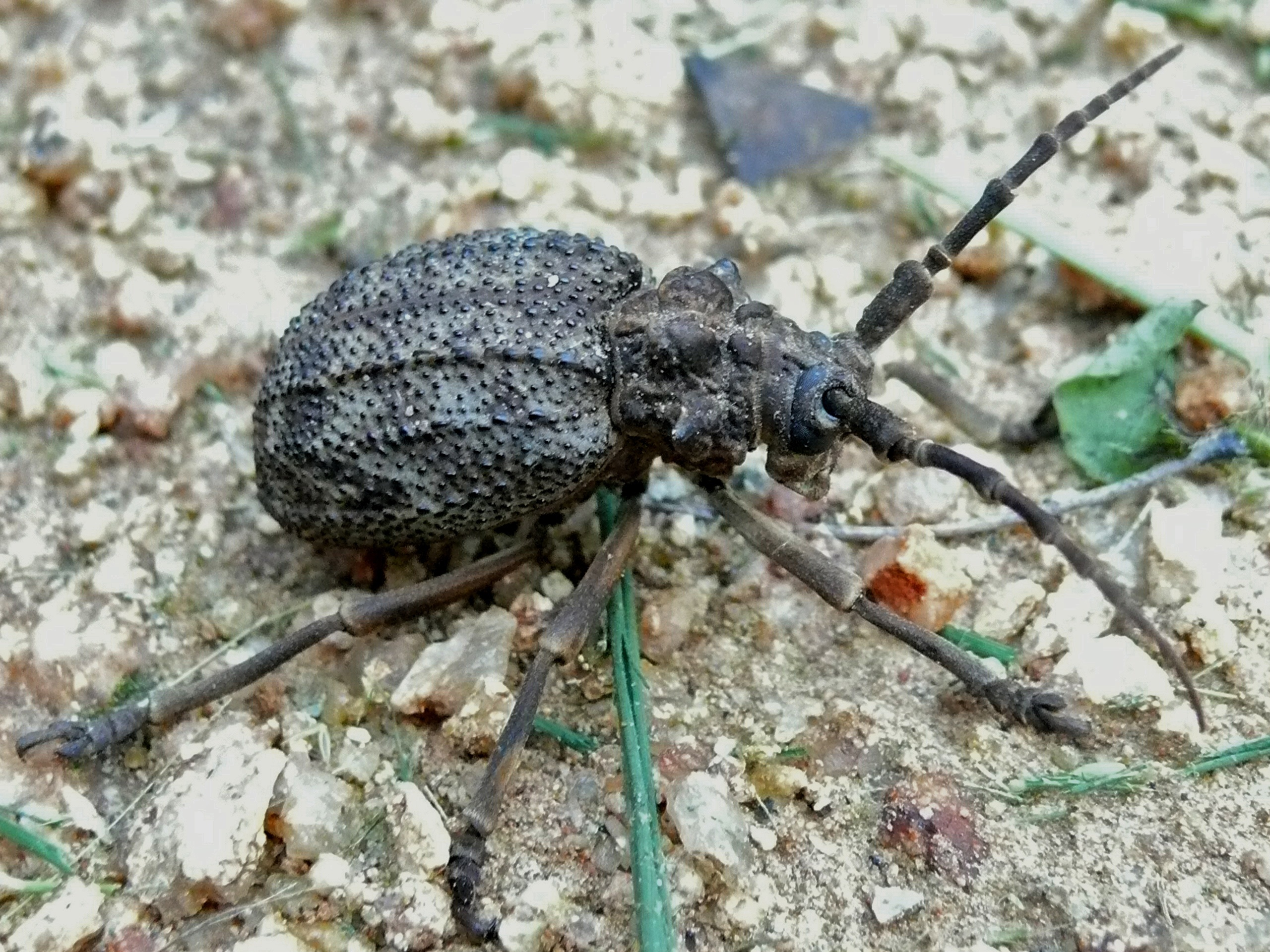
- Phantasis carinata

Scientific classification
- Kingdom: Animalia
- Phylum: Arthropoda
- Clade: Pancrustacea
- Class: Insecta
- Order: Coleoptera
- Suborder: Polyphaga
- Infraorder: Cucujiformia
- Family: Cerambycidae
- Subfamily: Lamiinae
- Tribe: Phantasini
- Genus: Phantasis
- Species: P. carinata

Binomial name
- Phantasis carinata Fåhraeus, 1872

= Phantasis carinata =

Species of beetle

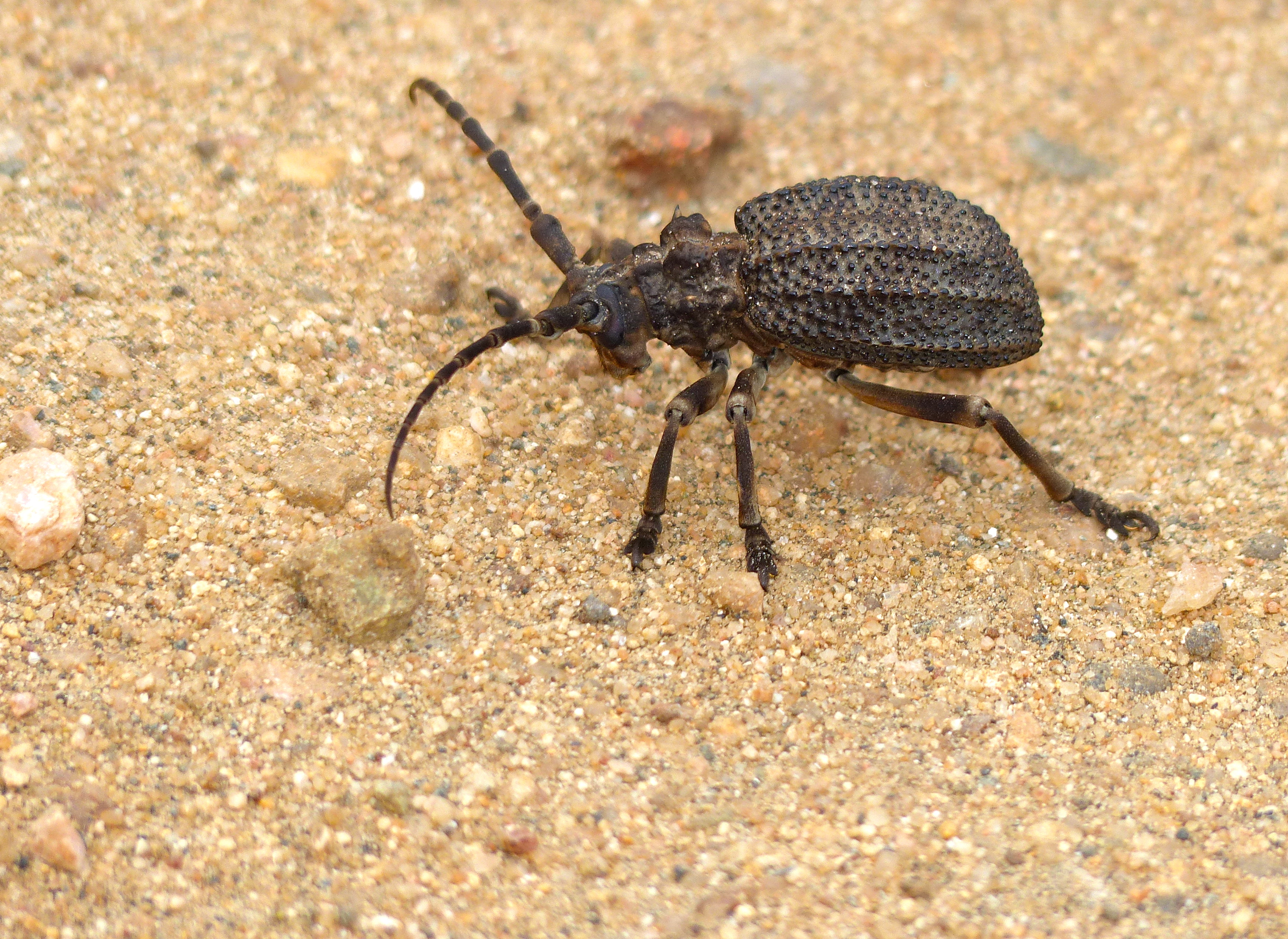
Phantasis carinata

Phantasis carinata is a species of beetle in the family Cerambycidae. It was described by Olof Fåhræus in 1872. It is known from South Africa and Mozambique.
