= Phantasis satanica =

Scientific classification
- Domain: Eukaryota
- Kingdom: Animalia
- Phylum: Arthropoda
- Class: Insecta
- Order: Coleoptera
- Suborder: Polyphaga
- Infraorder: Cucujiformia
- Family: Cerambycidae
- Subfamily: Lamiinae
- Tribe: Phantasini
- Genus: Phantasis
- Species: P. satanica

Binomial name
- Phantasis satanica Thomson, 1860

Synonyms
- Phantasis crampeli Breuning, 1967; Phantasis crampeli ituriensis Breuning, 1967; Phantasis satanica satanica Sudre & Teocchi, 2000

Species of beetle

Phantasis satanica is a species of beetle in the family Cerambycidae, found in Sub-Saharan Africa. It was described by James Thomson in 1860.

== Subspecies ==
- Phantasis satanica dolosa Kolbe, 1894
- Phantasis satanica satanica Thomson, 1860
