= Phantasis sansibarica =

Scientific classification
- Domain: Eukaryota
- Kingdom: Animalia
- Phylum: Arthropoda
- Class: Insecta
- Order: Coleoptera
- Suborder: Polyphaga
- Infraorder: Cucujiformia
- Family: Cerambycidae
- Subfamily: Lamiinae
- Tribe: Phantasini
- Genus: Phantasis
- Species: P. sansibarica

Binomial name
- Phantasis sansibarica (Harold, 1878)

Synonyms
- Phantasis auguria Kolbe, 1894; Phantasis avernica sansibarica (Harold, 1878); Phrissoma sansibaricum Harold, 1878

Species of beetle

Phantasis sansibarica is a species of beetle in the family Cerambycidae. It was described by Harold in 1878. It is known from Tanzania, Kenya, and Somalia.
