= Trichophantasis grandicollis =

Scientific classification
- Kingdom: Animalia
- Phylum: Arthropoda
- Class: Insecta
- Order: Coleoptera
- Suborder: Polyphaga
- Infraorder: Cucujiformia
- Family: Cerambycidae
- Genus: Trichophantasis
- Species: T. grandicollis

Binomial name
- Trichophantasis grandicollis (Breuning, 1967)

Species of beetle

Trichophantasis grandicollis is a species of beetle in the family Cerambycidae. It was described by Stephan von Breuning in 1967.
