= Acanthesthes amycteroides =

Scientific classification
- Domain: Eukaryota
- Kingdom: Animalia
- Phylum: Arthropoda
- Class: Insecta
- Order: Coleoptera
- Suborder: Polyphaga
- Infraorder: Cucujiformia
- Family: Cerambycidae
- Genus: Acanthesthes
- Species: A. amycteroides

Binomial name
- Acanthesthes amycteroides (White, 1858)

Synonyms
- Acanthesthes heros (Pascoe, 1864); Acanthesthes spinosa Breuning, 1939; Phantasis heros Pascoe, 1864; Phantasis tuberculifera Thomson, 1865; Phrissoma amycteroides White, 1858

Species of beetle

Acanthesthes amycteroides is a species of beetle in the family Cerambycidae. It was described by Adam White in 1858. It is known from South Africa.

Acanthesthes amycteroides measure 17–29 mm (0.67–1.14 in) in length.

The junior synonym A. spinosa's type location is Port Natal and its initial description listed a length of 21 mm and a width of 9 mm.
