= Trichophantasis =

Scientific classification
- Kingdom: Animalia
- Phylum: Arthropoda
- Class: Insecta
- Order: Coleoptera
- Suborder: Polyphaga
- Infraorder: Cucujiformia
- Family: Cerambycidae
- Tribe: Phantasini
- Genus: Trichophantasis

Genus of beetles

Trichophantasis is a genus of longhorn beetles of the subfamily Lamiinae, containing the following species:

- Trichophantasis grandicollis (Breuning, 1967)
- Trichophantasis subtuberculata (Breuning, 1967)
