= Acanthesthes =

Scientific classification
- Domain: Eukaryota
- Kingdom: Animalia
- Phylum: Arthropoda
- Class: Insecta
- Order: Coleoptera
- Suborder: Polyphaga
- Infraorder: Cucujiformia
- Family: Cerambycidae
- Tribe: Phantasini
- Genus: Acanthesthes; Kolbe, 1894

species
- 2 species (see text)

Genus of beetles

Acanthesthes is a genus of longhorn beetles of the subfamily Lamiinae. They occur in Southern Africa.

== Species ==
There are two recognized species:

- Acanthesthes amycteroides (White, 1858)
- Acanthesthes crispa (Olivier, 1792)
