= Acanthesthes crispa =

Scientific classification
- Domain: Eukaryota
- Kingdom: Animalia
- Phylum: Arthropoda
- Class: Insecta
- Order: Coleoptera
- Suborder: Polyphaga
- Infraorder: Cucujiformia
- Family: Cerambycidae
- Genus: Acanthesthes
- Species: A. crispa

Binomial name
- Acanthesthes crispa (Olivier, 1792)

Synonyms
- Acanthesthes carinata Breuning, 1939; Acanthesthes hipporhina (White, 1858); Cerambyx crispus (Olivier, 1792); Lamia crispa Olivier, 1792 nec Fabricius, 1776; Phantasis brachyderoides Thomson, 1867; Phantasis denticulata Thomson, 1860; Phantasis gmelini Gemminger, 1873; Phrissoma crispum (Olivier, 1792); Phrissoma hipporhinus White, 1858

Species of beetle

Acanthesthes crispa is a species of beetle in the family Cerambycidae. It was described by Guillaume-Antoine Olivier in 1792 or 1800, depending on the source. It is known from South Africa and Mozambique.

Acanthesthes crispa measure 17–25 mm (0.67–0.98 in) in length.

Its junior synonym A. carinata's type locality is Grahamstown, South Africa and its initial description recorded its length as 22 mm and its width as 11 mm.
