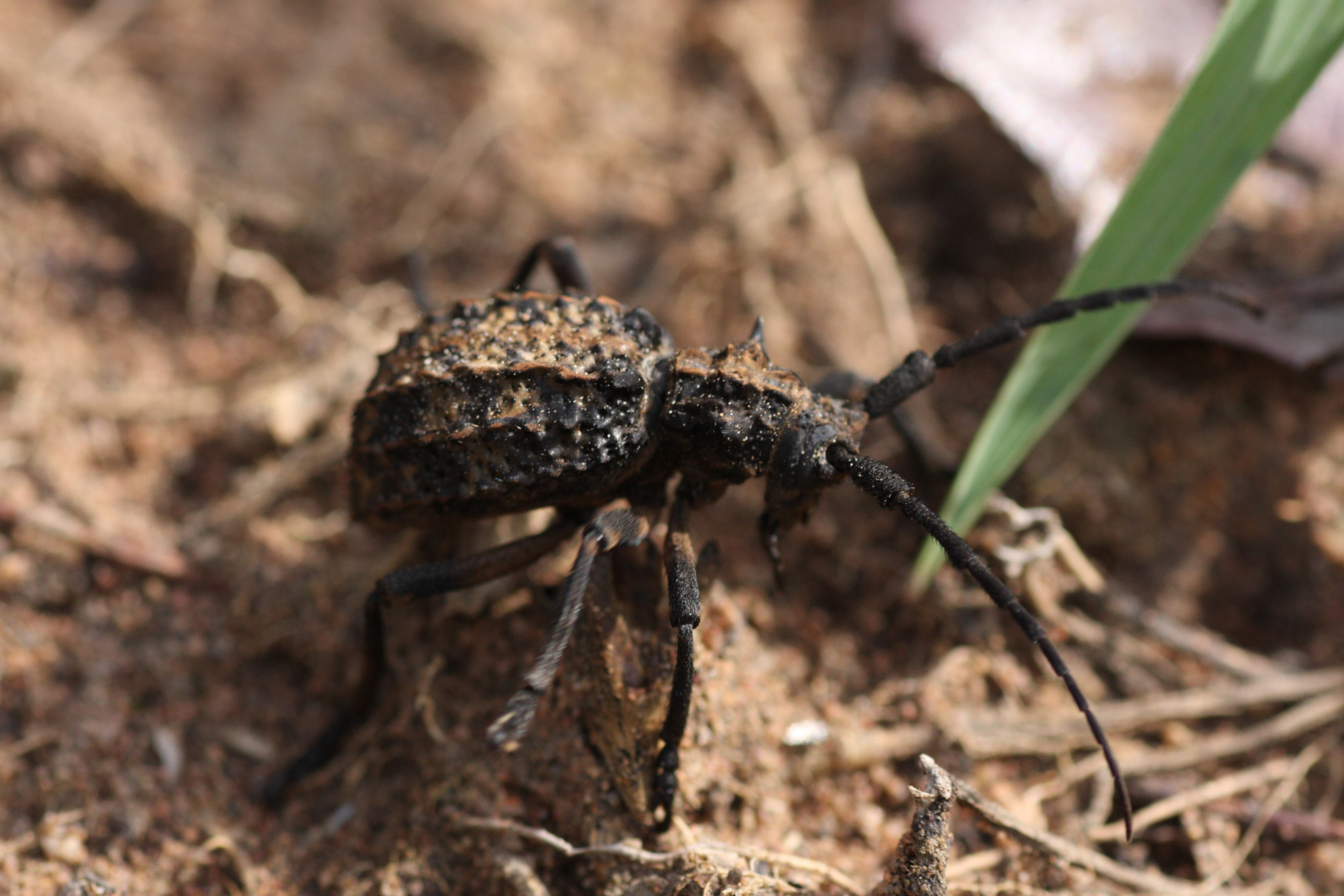
- Phantasis avernica, Zambia

Scientific classification
- Domain: Eukaryota
- Kingdom: Animalia
- Phylum: Arthropoda
- Class: Insecta
- Order: Coleoptera
- Suborder: Polyphaga
- Infraorder: Cucujiformia
- Family: Cerambycidae
- Subfamily: Lamiinae
- Tribe: Phantasini
- Genus: Phantasis; Thomson, 1860

= Phantasis =

Genus of beetles

Phantasis is a genus of longhorn beetles of the subfamily Lamiinae, containing the following species:

- Phantasis ardoini Breuning, 1967
- Phantasis avernica Thomson, 1865
- Phantasis carinata Fåhraeus, 1872
- Phantasis gigantea (Guérin-Méneville, 1844)
- Phantasis nodulosa Sudre & Teocchi
- Phantasis sansibarica (Harold, 1878)
- Phantasis satanica Thomson, 1860
- Phantasis stupida Kolbe, 1894
- Phantasis tenebricosa Sudre & Teocchi
