= Phantasini =

Scientific classification
- Kingdom: Animalia
- Phylum: Arthropoda
- Class: Insecta
- Order: Coleoptera
- Suborder: Polyphaga
- Infraorder: Cucujiformia
- Family: Cerambycidae
- Subfamily: Lamiinae
- Tribe: Phantasini; Hunt & Breuning, 1957

Tribe of beetles

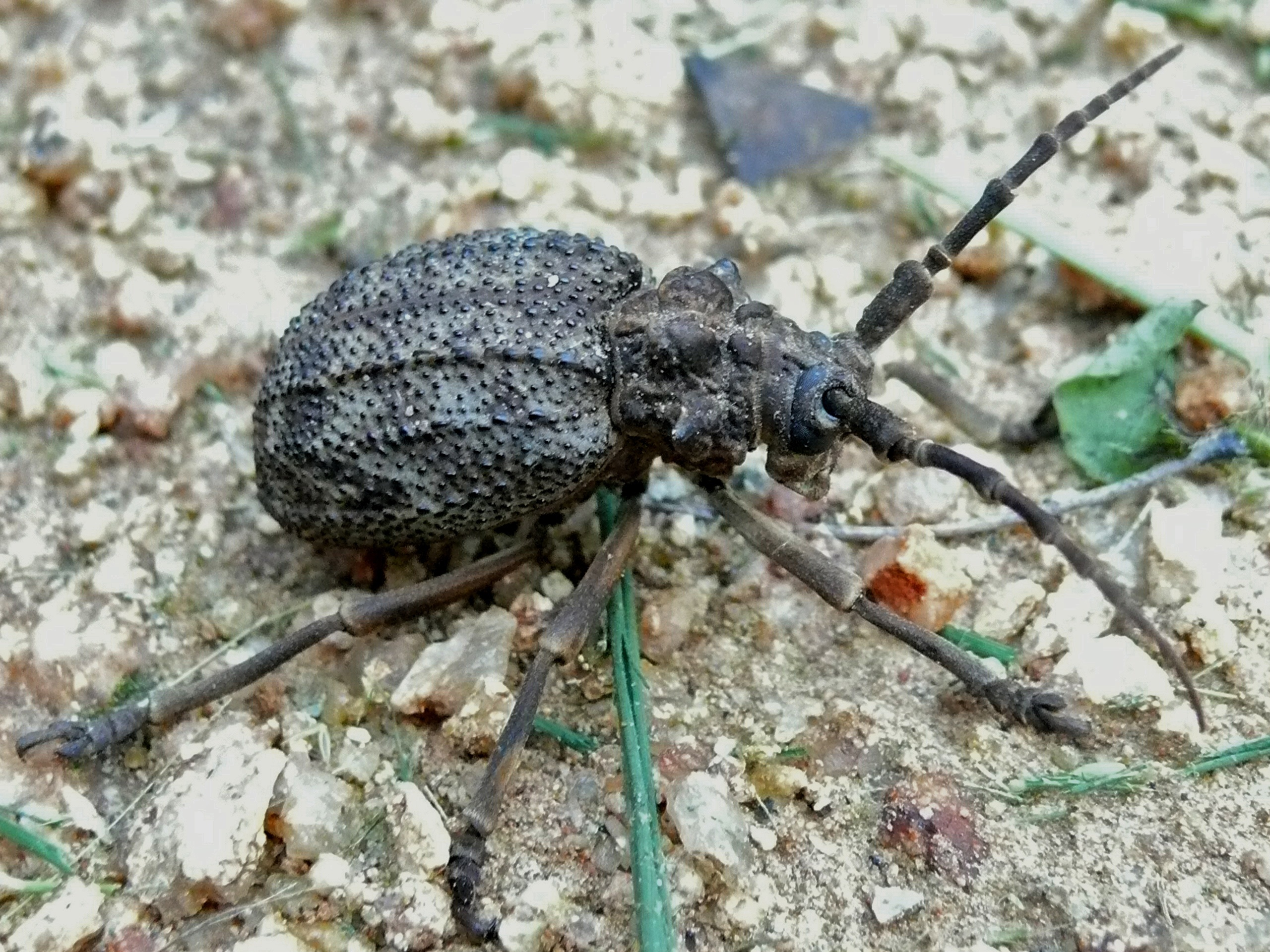
Phantasis Carinata

Phantasini is a tribe of longhorn beetles of the subfamily Lamiinae. It was described by Hunt and Stephan von Breuning in 1957.

== Taxonomy ==
- Acanthesthes Kolbe, 1894
- Phantasis Thomson, 1860
- Trichophantasis Sudre & Teocchi, 2000
